= List of clubs in the Landesliga Bayern-Süd =

This is a List of clubs in the Landesliga Bayern-Süd, including all clubs and their final placings from the first season in 1963–64 to 2010–11. The league, commonly referred to as the Landesliga Süd, is the second-highest football league in the state of Bavaria (German: Bayern) and the Bavarian football league system. It is one of three Landesligas in Bavarian football, the 6th tier of the German football league system. Until the introduction of the 3. Liga in 2008 it was the 5th tier.

== Overview ==
Since the formation of the league in 1963, it has served as the tier below the Bayernliga, together with the northern and the central division of the Landesliga. Originally a tier-four league, it was demoted to tier-five status in 1994, when the Regionalligas were introduced. In 2008, it was then demoted to tier-six status, when the 3. Liga was established.

Originally, the Bezirksligas were the feeder leagues to the Landesliga Süd, of which there were, for the most part, five, three in Upper Bavaria and two in Bavarian Swabia. From 1988, Bezirksoberligas served as feeder leagues instead, having been established as a new tier between the Landesligas and the Bezirksligas. The two leagues below the Landesliga Süd have since been the Bezirksoberliga Oberbayern and the Bezirksoberliga Schwaben.

== Clubs and their placings ==
The complete list of clubs and placings in the league since the introduction of the league in 1963:

=== 1963–1988 ===
The first 25 seasons from 1963 to 1988:

Club	S	64	65	66	67	68	69	70	71	72	73	74	75	76	77	78	79	80	81	82	83	84	85	86	87	88
Bayern Munich Amateure	6	9	7	3	1	B	B	B	B	5	1	B	B	B	B	B	B	B	B	B	B	B	B	B	B	B
TSV Ampfing	13																1	B	B	B	B	B	B	B	B	B
SpVgg Unterhaching	2																	4	1	B	B	B	B	B	B	B
SC Fürstenfeldbruck	22								1	B	B	B	B	B	B	2	2	1	B	B	3	12	1	B	B	B
FC Wacker München	7	B	RL	B	B	B	B	B	RL	B	RL	B	B	B	B	B	B	B	3	1	B	B	B	2	1	B
MTV Ingolstadt ^{3}	15			1	B	2	1	B	B	B	B	B	B	B	1	B	2B	2B	B	B	B	B	B	4	2	B
Türk Gücü München ^{6}	11																							7	3	1
Schwaben Augsburg	22													12	14	14	5	3	2	B	B	B	10	6	8	2
SpVgg Starnberg ^{4}	12													5	3	8	11	11	17						6	3
TSV Großhadern	18																						4	1	B	4
FC Memmingen	8	6	11	14			3	1	B	B	B	B	B	B	B	B	B	B	B	B	B	B	B	B	B	5
Wacker Burghausen	23			10	4	12	13	12	3	3	2	9	10	11	9	16						2	5	9	10	6
TSV Landsberg	17									13	7	11	12	7	16										5	7
BC Aichach	29	15				10	10	4	7	11	14	4	5	14		7	13	7	15					8	4	8
SV Lohhof	4																									9
TSV 1860 Rosenheim	36	4	3	2	10	11	11	15			8	7	13	1	B	B	B	B	B	B	7	4	3	13	11	10
ESV Ingolstadt ^{3}	9	B	B	B	B	B	B	B	B	B	B	B	B	B	B	B	B	2B	2B	B	4	1	B	B	13	11
TSV Aindling	11																				2	3	13	11	9	12
FC Gundelfingen	31									10	11	5	11	6	6	6	9	8	10	8	14	14	7	10	12	13
FC Kempten	25	5	13	16					6	7	9	13	8	8	13	17					5	5	14			14
TSV Dasing	7																									15
TSG Augsburg	18	1	B	4	5	5	6	2	8	4	5	8	2	12	17							7	6	3	7	16
TSV Allach	1																									17
FC Emmering	11														10	15	6	5	8	7	12	6	9	15		18
VfR Neuburg	9									8	3	3	1	B	B	B	B	B	7	4	16			12	14	
TSV Ottobrunn	7												3	2	5	5	7	15							15	
FC Lauingen	8							14	11	9	6	6	15	17											16	
TuS Raubling	1																								17	
TSV Trudering	1																								18	
TSV Eching	20																			6	1	B	2	B	19	
1. FC Moosining	6									18										13	10	10	8	14		
SpVgg Kaufbeuren	19	2	1	B	B	1	B	B	10	6	4	1	B	B	7	13	8	10	5	3	9	9	11	16		
SV Ober-Germaringen	10											12	9	10	12	12	12	17				8	12	17		
SpVgg Günz-Lauben	1																							18		
ASV Dachau	19	7	10	9	7	7	9	3	9	16				9	8	9	14	14	9	13	11	8	13			
TSV Göggingen	2														18								15			
TSV 1861 Nördlingen	24		12	13	14								4	3	4	3	4	12	9	9	6	11	16			
TSV Gaimersheim	1																						17			
TSV Marktl	2																				17		18			
TSV Mindelheim	8																	13					19			
SpVgg Feldmoching	1																					15				
SV Karlshuld	2																				11	16				
SC 1880 München	3																		11	14		17				
DJK Langenmoosen	2																				13	18				
TSV Marktoberdorf	3																18			12	15					
SB/DJK Rosenheim	9															1	B	2	4	10	18					
TSV Murnau	2																			5	19					
TSV 1860 München Am. ^{1}	14	12	2	6	2	9	4	8	15			2	6	16					6	2						
TSV Rain am Lech	13													15						15						
TSV Rohrbach	2																	14		16						
SSV Glött	1																		14							
SV Türkheim	1																		16							
Olympia Neugablonz	12			8	6	4	5	17					7	4	11	10	3	6	18							
SSV Dillingen	1																	16								
TSV Kösching	5					14	18									11	10	18								
MTV München	1																15									
FC Augsburg Amateure	11														2	4	16									
TSG Stadtbergen	1																17									
TSV Haunstetten	4							7	16		18					18										
SV Kirchanschöring	2														15											
SC Unterpfaffenhofen	3											14	14	18												
1. FC Garmisch	6							6	4	17			16													
TSV Herrsching	3										12	10	17													
BSC Sendling	5							5	2	1	B	B	18													
TSG Pasing	10		9	5	3	3	2	9	5	2	13	15														
SV Klingsmoos	1											16														
SC Eintracht Freising	13								13	12	10	17														
Falke Markt Schwaben	16					15	15	10	12	14	15	18														
SpVgg Helios München	1	B	B	B	B	B	B	B	B	B	17															
TSV Pfersee	1										16															
SV Zuchering	6				8	8	8	11	14	15																
VfR Jettingen	1								17																	
TSV Milbertshofen	3						12	13	18																	
TSV Trostberg	6		5	12	13	6	7	16																		
TSV Schwabmünchen	8						14	18																		
Sportfreunde Pasing	4	8	4	15			16																			
TSV Wolfratshausen	3				9	13	17																			
Meringer SV	5	3	8	11	11	16																				
FSV Pfaffenhofen	5	10	6	7	12	17																				
Schwaben Augsburg Am.	1				15																					
FC Deisenhofen	2	11	14																							
TSV Kriegshaber	2	13	15																							
TSV Gersthofen	5	14																								
TSV Kottern	9	16																								

=== 1988–2012 ===
The last 24 seasons from 1988 to 2012:

Club	S	89	90	91	92	93	94	95	96	97	98	99	00	01	02	03	04	05	06	07	08	09	10	11	12
Wacker Burghausen	23	6	5	4	8	1	B	B	R	R	R	R	R	R	R	2B	2B	2B	2B	2B	R	3L	3L	3L	3L
TSV 1860 München II ^{1}	14								1	B	R	R	R	R	B	B	B	R	R	R	R	R	R	R	R
FC Memmingen	8	2	B	B	B	B	B	B	B	B	B	B	B	B	B	1	B	B	B	B	B	B	B	R	R
FC Ingolstadt 04 II ^{3}	2																			6	2	B	B	B	R
TSV Aindling	11	14				7	15	6	2	B	B	B	B	B	B	B	B	B	B	B	B	B	B	B	B
FC Ismaning	4									8	4	3	1	B	B	B	B	B	B	B	B	B	B	B	B
SpVgg Unterhaching II	2												3	2	B	B	B	B	B	B	B	R	B	B	B
TSV Buchbach	4																	12	6	5	1	B	B	B	B
TSV Rain am Lech	13										6	9	4	10	9	7	5	3	7	3	3	B	B	B	B
TSV 1860 Rosenheim	36	12	7	14	7	8	5	1	B	1	B	7	12	12	6	11	13	5	3	11	8	1	B	B	B
SV Heimstetten	5																7	4	1	B	B	10	1	B	B
SB/DJK Rosenheim	9																				9	4	5	1	B
TSV Gersthofen	5																				15	12	13	2	B
Wacker Burghausen II	9														13	10	3	1	B	B	6	5	6	15	1
FC Augsburg II	11																	10	5	4	4	9	3	5	2
TSV Schwabmünchen	8													15			19					7	11	13	3
VfB Eichstätt	3																						2	14	4
1. FC Sonthofen	4																				10	6	16		5
TSV Kottern	9						14	11	17							15			11	17				3	6
BCF Wolfratshausen	9															5	2	B	4	13	7	8	8	10	7
BC Aichach	29	4	10	7	4	5	12	17		5	11	15	17												8
SC Fürstenfeldbruck	22	16					10	10	8	12	9	11	10	8	1	B	B	B	B	B	5	11	7	8	9
TSV Landsberg	17	11	15					4	10	2	B	18											12	7	10
FC Pipinsried	17		14	11	12	16							15	9	5	9	16	11	8	12	12	14	15	11	11
FC Unterföhring	2																							4	12
FC Gundelfingen	31	13	11	2	2	2	B	B	B	B	17		7	6	3	17							14	9	13
TSV Eching	20	10	1	B	B	B	4	2	4	4	12	13	14	4	11	8	17	17					17		14
SV Pullach	4																					3	9	6	15
SV Kirchanschöring	2																								16
VfB Durach	1																								17
TSG Thannhausen	8			17											12	18		9	2	2	B	B	B	12	18
FC Affing	6																		12	9	13	2	4	16	
Falke Markt Schwaben	16													1	B	B	4	6	13	10	16	13	10	17	
FC Gerolfing	1																							18	
TSV Großhadern	18	7	3	12	13	15		5	11	6	16	16							10	7	11	15	18		
SV Raisting	3															16					14	16			
FC Memmingen II	1																					18			
FC Kempten	25							7	15		8	1	B	B	4	4	8	2	B	1	B	17			
TSV 1861 Nördlingen	24					9	6	12	14	16					17			14	14	8	17				
FC Königsbrunn	15	5	9	8	3	14	7	8	9	18				5	10	13	18			14	18				
SC Eintracht Freising	13											10	6	3	8	6	11	8	9	15					
TSV München-Grünwald	6	8	13	9	16								16							16					
Schwaben Augsburg	22	B	B	1	B	13	8	3	12	10	1	B	B	B	2	B	9	7	15	18					
DJK Lechhausen	7								5	11	15	19					14	15	16						
FT Starnberg 09 ^{4}	4														16		12	13	17						
SK Srbija München	1																		18						
SC Bubesheim	5													7	14	14	15	16							
SC Fürstenfeldbruck II	1																	18							
TSV Neusäss	3															12	10	19							
MTV Ingolstadt ^{3}	15	B	B	B	B	4	3	B	3	3	3	8	2	B	B	3	1								
SV Gendorf ^{2}	3														7	2	6								
TSV Ampfing	13	B	12	3	9	11	16	14	16		5	4	5	11	15										
TSV Bobingen	7								7	13	10	2	9	14	18										
Türk SV München ^{6}	11	B	B	B	B	3	1	B	B	7	2	5	11	13	19										
SV Lohhof	4	3	2	B	B	B	B	R	B	B	B	B	R	B	20										
TSV Ebersberg	1													16											
FC Miesbach	9				14		13	13	13	9	14	12	13	17											
TuS Geretsried	6							9	6	17		6	8	18											
TSV Mindelheim	8				11	17				15	7	14	18												
SpVgg Kaufbeuren	19							15				17													
FSV München	3	17		16							13														
1. FC Garmisch	6									14	18														
ESV Freilassing	2			15					18																
FC Enikon Augsburg ^{5}	1						2	B																	
BSG Himolla Taufkirchen	6		8	10	6	10	11	16																	
TSV Dasing	7		4	5	10	6	9	18																	
ESV Ingolstadt ^{3}	9	9	17		5	12	17																		
BSC Sendling	5					18																			
SpVgg Starnberg ^{4}	12	1	B	6	1																				
FC Wacker München	7	B	6	13	15																				
MSV München	1		17																						
VfL Günzburg	1	15																							

=== Key ===
Symbol	Key
B	Bundesliga
RL 2B	Regionalliga Süd (1963–74): 2. Bundesliga (1974–present)
3L	3. Liga
R	Regionalliga Süd (1994–present)
B	Bayernliga
1	League champions
Place	League
Blank	Played at a league level below this league

- S = No of seasons in league (as of 2011-12)

=== Notes ===
- ^{1} The TSV 1860 Munich II withdrew from the league in 1982 after the forced relegation of its first team to the Bayernliga.
- ^{2} The SV Gendorf Burgkirchen withdrew its team from the league in 2004.
- ^{3} The MTV Ingolstadt and ESV Ingolstadt merged in 2004 to form FC Ingolstadt 04.
- ^{4} The football departments of FT Starnberg 09 merged with SpVgg Starnberg to form FC Starnberg in 1992. In 2001, the FC Starnberg was dissolved and the football department re-joined FT Starnberg 09.
- ^{5} The FC Enikon Augsburg folded in 1995.
- ^{6} Türk Gücü München folded in 2001 and reformed as Türkischer SV 1975 München. In 2009, the club merged with SV Ataspor to form SV Türkgücü-Ataspor München.
