= Philipp Beigl =

German footballer (born 1992)

Personal information
- Date of birth: 27 September 1992 (age 34)
- Place of birth: Türkheim, Germany
- Height: 1.87 m (6 ft 2 in)
- Position: Goalkeeper

Youth career
- SV Salamander Türkheim
- TSV Schwabmünchen
- 2006–2010: FC Memmingen

Senior career*
| Years | Team | Apps | (Gls) |
| 2010–2016 | FC Memmingen II | | |
| 2010–2016 | FC Memmingen | 13 | (0) |
| 2016–2018 | TSV Landsberg | 51 | (0) |
| 2020–2021 | New Mexico United | 1 | (0) |
| 2022 | El Paso Locomotive | 0 | (0) |
- * Club domestic league appearances and goals as of 22:24, 12 April 2022 (UTC)

Philipp Beigl (born 27 September 1992) is a German professional footballer who plays as a goalkeeper.

== Early life ==
A native of Türkheim, Germany, Beigl played youth football with SV Salamander Türkheim and TSV Schwabmünchen, later moving to the FC Memmingen youth system in 2006, from U15 through U19, before joining their senior teams.

== Career ==
=== FC Memmingen ===
Beigl made his senior debut for FC Memmingen when he was 17, staying with the senior side for seven seasons, in the German fourth tier (Regionalliga Süd and later the Regionalliga Bayern). He primarily served as the backup keeper with the first team, with most of his playing time coming with the reserve team in the lower leagues.

=== TSV Landsberg ===
In 2016, he signed with TSV Landsberg in the fifth tier Bayernliga, serving as the first-choice keeper. During his time at Landsberg, he was considered a "cornerstone" of the team. His contract with Landsberg expired in July 2018.

In December 2018, he attended a combine in the United States, hoping to earn a professional contract, after struggling to find a new club in Europe.

=== New Mexico United ===
In 2020, Beigl joined USL Championship club New Mexico United, serving as the team's primary backup keeper. He made his first appearance for New Mexico on 30 June 2021 in a 3–2 defeat to the Real Monarchs.

=== El Paso Locomotive ===
In January 2022, he signed with USL Championship club El Paso Locomotive FC. He made his debut on 5 April, in a 4–1 loss to Central Valley Fuego in the second round of the U.S. Open Cup. It was announced on 18 October that he would not return for the following season after his contract expired.

== Personal life ==
Beigl met his wife Margo, while vacationing in the Dominican Republic, getting married in November 2019. He has permanent residency status in the United States, qualifying him as a domestic player.
