= Schwaben Cup =

- Founded: 1947
- Folded: 2009
- Country: Germany
- State: Bavaria
- Promotion to: DFB-Pokal
- Last champions: TSV Aindling (2008–09)

The Schwaben Cup (German: Schwäbischer Pokal) was a domestic cup competition in the Bavarian Regierungsbezirk of Swabia (German: Schwaben), played from 1947 to 2009.

== Overview ==
The competition was first played in 1947, before the reintroduction of the German Cup. With the introduction of the national cup competition, the Schwaben Cup also became a qualifying competition for it.

The Schwaben Cup has been played annually since 1947 with the exception of 1956 and 1957, when it was not held. The competition was open to all senior men's teams from the Bezirk of Schwaben and clubs that play in the Schwaben football league system. However, it was not open to professional teams, meaning a club in the Bundesliga or 2. Bundesliga could not take part. The FC Augsburg, record winner of the competition, currently in the second division, would therefore not have been able to enter its first team. The competition was also open to reserve sides.

From 1998, the Schwaben Cup winner was eligible to take part in the Bavarian Cup and past winners have also taken part in this competition and thereby qualified for the German Cup. The TSV Aindling in 2003 and the TSG Thannhausen in 2006 have done so.

A fixed rule of the competition was that the lower classed team would always have home advantage. Further in the past, another rule stipulated that the lower classed team did not need to win a tie to advance, a draw being sufficient. This rule was however very unpopular with the stronger clubs and was rescinded after the 1998 final.

With the expansion of the Bavarian Cup from 2009–10 onwards, the Schwaben Cup ceased to be held. The only thing remaining of the old competition is the three Kreis Cup competitions, who now function as a qualifying round to the Bavarian Cup.

== Modus ==
The cup operated on a system where it is split into three regions, Augsburg, Allgäu and Donau. Each of those regions roughly covers the areas of two Kreissligas:

- Donau:
  - Kreisliga Schwaben-Nord
  - Kreisliga Schwaben-West
- Augsburg:
  - Kreisliga Schwaben-Augsburg
  - Kreisliga Schwaben-Ost
- Allgäu:
  - Kreisliga Schwaben-Mitte
  - Kreisliga Schwaben-Süd

Clubs from the Kreisliga, the Kreisklasses and A-Klasses below it but also the clubs in the Bezirksliga and Bezirksoberliga from this area play out a cup winner of their own. This winner then faces the winner of its sister region (German: Kreis). The three remaining clubs of this competitions then entered the final rounds of the Schwaben Cup, together with the clubs from Schwaben which play in the Landesliga, Bayernliga and Regionalliga.

At the end of this process was the Schwaben Cup final which was played at a neutral ground.

== Cup finals since 1947 ==
Season	Winner	Finalist	Result
1946–47	FC Gundelfingen	TSV Göggingen	6–1
1947–48	VfL Günzburg	TSV Gersthofen	5–2
1948–49	FC Gundelfingen	TSV Sonthofen	2–1
1949–50	VfL Günzburg	VfR Neuburg	2–0
1950–51	TG Viktoria Augsburg	TSV Gersthofen	3–1
1951–52	SpVgg Kaufbeuren	TSV Gersthofen	4–1
1952–53	TSV Gersthofen	BC Augsburg II	7–2
1953–54	TSV Gersthofen	TSV Kottern	2–0
1954–55	FC Gundelfingen	FC Bad Wörishofen	
1955–56	not held		
1956–57	not held		
1957–58	FC Memmingen	PSV Augsburg	1–0
1958–59	TSV Schwaben Augsburg	SpVgg Kaufbeuren	5–2
1959–60	SpVgg Kaufbeuren	TSV Kriegshaber	3–0
1960–61	SpVgg Kaufbeuren	TSV 1861 Nördlingen	2–0
1961–62	TG Viktoria Augsburg	FC Kempten	1–0
1962–63	FC Kempten	BC Augsburg II	2–1
1963–64	BSK Olympia Neugablonz	TSV Gersthofen	5–2
1964–65	BC Augsburg	BSK Olympia Neugablonz	2–2 aet
1965–66	BSK Olympia Neugablonz	FC Gundelfingen	5–1
1966–67	FC Memmingen	FC Gundelfingen	2–0
1967–68	TSV Haunstetten	SSV Dillingen	3–2 aet
1968–69	FC Augsburg	SV Klingsmoos	5–2
1969–70	FC Augsburg	TSG Augsburg	1–0 aet
1970–71	FC Augsburg	SV Salamander Türkheim	3–1
1971–72	FC Augsburg	FC Memmingen	2–1 aet
1972–73	BSK Olympia Neugablonz	SC Altenmünster	6–0
1973–74	TSG Thannhausen	TSV Haunstetten	2–0
1974–75	TSG Thannhausen	SSV Dillingen	3–2
1975–76	FC Memmingen	SV Ober–Germaringen	3–2
1976–77	FC Augsburg II	FC Füssen	3–2
1977–78	SSV Glött	SV Ober–Germaringen	6–4 after pen.
1978–79	BSK Olympia Neugablonz	SV Salamander Türkheim	5–3
1979–80	FC Augsburg	TSV Gersthofen	4–1
1980–81	TSV 1861 Nördlingen	TSV Aindling	3–0
1981–82	SV Ober–Germaringen	TSV 1861 Nördlingen	2–1
1982–83	DJK Langenmosen	FC Augsburg II	5–3
1983–84	TSV Aindling	TSG Thannhausen	2–0
1984–85	FC Kempten	TSV Aindling	2–1 aet
1985–86	FC Augsburg	TSV Landsberg	3–2
1986–87	FC Kempten	TSG Augsburg	1–0
1987–88	FC Augsburg	TSV Königsbrunn	4–2 aet
1988–89	TSV 1861 Nördlingen	TSV Dasing	5–1
1989–90	TSV Mindelheim	TSV 1861 Nördlingen	2–0
1990–91	FC Gundelfingen	TSV Dasing	3–1
1991–92	FC Gundelfingen	FC Augsburg	2–0
1992–93	FC Augsburg	FC Memmingen	3–2
1993–94	SC Altenmünster	FC Memmingen	2–2 aet
1994–95	TSV Aindling	FC Kempten	3–1 aet
1995–96	FC Augsburg	DJK Lechhausen	5–3
1996–97	TSV Aindling	TSV Schwaben Augsburg	2–1 aet
1997–98	BC Aichach	FC Memmingen	1–1 aet
1998–99	FC Augsburg	TSV Kottern	4–2
1999–2000	TSV Rain am Lech	TSV Mindelheim	2–0
2000–01	FC Gundelfingen	FC Königsbrunn	0–0 / 4–3 after pen.
2001–02	FC Augsburg	TSV Neusäß	6–0
2002–03	TSV Aindling	TSV 1861 Nördlingen	1–1 / 4–3 after pen.
2003–04	FC Augsburg	TSV Aindling	3–3 / 7–6 after pen.
2004–05	FC Augsburg	TSG Thannhausen	2–0
2005–06	TSG Thannhausen	FC Memmingen	4–2
2006–07	TSV 1861 Nördlingen	FC Augsburg II	0–0 / 4–3 after pen.
2007–08	1. FC Sonthofen	FC Schrobenhausen	2–0
2008–09	TSV Aindling	TSV Rain am Lech	3–0

Source: ""Das Fussball–Jahresjournal"". Schwäbischer Fußball Bund.

- Winner always mentioned first.
- In 1965, 1994 and 1998 the title went to the lower-classed team in a drawn final.

== Winners and runners-up of the Schwaben Cup ==
The 43 teams that have won the cup or played in its final during its history:

Club	Wins	Finals
FC Augsburg	13	14
FC Gundelfingen	6	8
TSV Aindling	5	8
BSK Olympia Neugablonz	4	5
TSV 1861 Nördlingen	3	7
TSG Thannhausen	3	5
FC Kempten	3	5
FC Memmingen	3	8
SpVgg Kaufbeuren	3	4
TG Viktoria Augsburg	2	2
VfL Günzburg	2	2
TSV Gersthofen	2	7
1. FC Sonthofen	1	1
TSV Rain am Lech	1	2
BC Aichach	1	1

Club	Wins	Finals
SC Altenmünster	1	2
TSV Mindelheim	1	2
DJK Langenmosen	1	1
SVO Germaringen	1	3
SSV Glött	1	1
FC Augsburg II	1	3
TSV Haunstetten	1	2
BC Augsburg	1	1
TSV Schwaben Augsburg	1	2
FC Königsbrunn	0	2
TSV Kottern	0	2
TSV Dasing	0	2
TSG Augsburg	0	2
SV Salamander Türkheim	0	2

Club	Wins	Finals
SSV Dillingen	0	2
BC Augsburg II	0	2
FC Schrobenhausen	0	1
TSV Neusäß	0	1
DJK Lechhausen	0	1
TSV Landsberg	0	1
FC Füssen	0	1
SV Klingsmoos	0	1
TSV Kriegshaber	0	1
PSV Augsburg	0	1
FC Bad Wörishofen	0	1
VfR Neuburg	0	1
TSV Sonthofen	0	1
TSV Göggingen	0	1

Denotes teams qualified for the first round of the DFB-Cup.

== DFB-Pokal appearances ==
Since 1974, the Schwaben Cup winners, and in some seasons the runners-up, an eligible to qualify for the first round of the German Cup. In the past, qualification matches against the cup winners from the other six Bavarian regional cup competition were necessary, since the establishment of the Bavarian Cup, this competition functions as qualifying stage. On a large number of occasions, the FC Augsburg has qualified for the German Cup on merit of its membership to the 2. Bundesliga, these appearances are not listed here:

Season	Round	Date	Home	Away	Result	Attendance
1975–76 DFB-Pokal	First round	1 August 1975	TSG Thannhausen	Bayer 04 Leverkusen	0-6	4,000
1976–77 DFB-Pokal	First round	6 August 1976	SVO Germaringen	VfR Laboe	9-0	
1976–77 DFB-Pokal	Second round	16 October 1976	Arminia Bielefeld	SVO Germaringen	6-0	
1977–78 DFB-Pokal	First round	29 July 1977	Arminia Hannover	FC Augsburg II	0-1	
1977–78 DFB-Pokal	Second round	20 August 1977	1. FC Normannia Gmünd	FC Augsburg II	1-2	
1977–78 DFB-Pokal	Third round	14 October 1977	FC Augsburg II	Hertha BSC Berlin	0-4	
1978–79 DFB-Pokal	First round	5 August 1978	SSV Glött	FC Bayern Munich	0-5	8,000
1978–79 DFB-Pokal	First round	5 August 1978	SVO Germaringen	VfR 1910 Bürstadt	1-7	
1979–80 DFB-Pokal	First round	25 August 1979	Eintracht Frankfurt	BSK Olympia Neugablonz	6-1	3,000
1979–80 DFB-Pokal	First round	26 August 1979	Bonner SC	SV Salamander Türkheim	4-0	1,100
1980–81 DFB-Pokal	First round	30 August 1980	TSV Gersthofen	OSC Bremerhaven	0-1	1,200
1980–81 DFB-Pokal	First round	30 August 1980	FC Augsburg	Wuppertaler SV	2-0	
1980–81 DFB-Pokal	Second round	1980	FC Augsburg	FSV Mainz 05	2-0	
1980–81 DFB-Pokal	Third round	22 November 1980	FC Augsburg	SV Werder Bremen	1-3	
1981–82 DFB-Pokal	First round	28 August 1981	TSV 1861 Nördlingen	VfB Oldenburg	0-3	1,800
1982–83 DFB-Pokal	First round	27 August 1983	SVO Germaringen	Hammer SpVgg	1-2	
1986–87 DFB-Pokal	First round	27 August 1986	TSV 1860 Munich	FC Augsburg	1-5 aet	
1986–87 DFB-Pokal	Second round	24 October 1986	FC Augsburg	Hamburger SV	1-2	20,000
1988–89 DFB-Pokal	First round	6 August 1988	FC Augsburg	Alemannia Aachen	1-4	
1992–93 DFB-Pokal	First round	18 August 1992	FC Gundelfingen	KFC Uerdingen 05	0-1	4,500
1993–94 DFB-Pokal	First round	bye				
1993–94 DFB-Pokal	Second round	24 August 1993	FC Augsburg	Rot-Weiß Lüdenscheid	2-0	800
1993–94 DFB-Pokal	Third round	11 September 1993	FC Augsburg	SpVgg Marl	3-0	1,300
1993–94 DFB-Pokal	Fourth round	26 October 1993	FC Augsburg	Bayer 04 Leverkusen	0-0 (3-4 pen)	18,000
2000–01 DFB-Pokal	First round	27 August 2000	TSV Rain am Lech	FC Schalke 04	0-7	6,000
2003–04 DFB-Pokal	First round	30 August 2003	TSV Aindling	FC Schalke 04	0-3	6,400
2004–05 DFB-Pokal	First round	22 August 2004	TSV Aindling	Hertha BSC Berlin	0-1	5,200
2006–07 DFB-Pokal	First round	9 September 2006	TSG Thannhausen	Borussia Dortmund	0-3	10,500

Source:"DFB-Pokal" (in German). Weltfussball.de.
