= Bezirksliga Schwaben-Süd =

- Founded: 1963
- Country: Germany
- State: Bavaria
- Number of clubs: 15
- Level on pyramid: Level 7
- Promotion to: Landesliga Südwest
- Relegation to: Kreisliga Augsburg; Kreisliga Mitte; Kreisliga Süd
- Current champions: SV Cosmos Aystetten (2019–21)

The Bezirksliga Schwaben-Süd is currently the seventh tier of the German football league system in the northern half of the Bavarian Regierungsbezirk of Swabia (German: Schwaben). Until the disbanding of the Bezirksoberliga Schwaben in 2012 it was the eighth tier. From 2008, when the 3. Liga was introduced, was the seventh tier of the league system, until the introduction of the Regionalligas in 1994 the sixth tier. From the leagues interception in 1968 to the introduction of the Bezirksoberliga in 1988 it was the fifth tier.

== Overview ==
Before the Bezirksoberligas in Bavaria were introduced in 1988 the Bezirksligas were the leagues set right below the Landesligas Bayern in the football pyramid. From 1963 to 1968 the Bezirksliga Schwaben was played in one single division, in 1968 it was split in a northern and a southern division. For the purpose of administration, the two leagues are still seen as one and teams can be shifted between the two halves at the end of season.

The winner of the Bezirksliga Schwaben-Süd, like the winner of the Bezirksliga Schwaben-Nord, is now directly promoted to the Landesliga Bayern-Südwest. From 1968 to 1988, the league champions were promoted to the Landesliga Bayern-Süd, from 1988 to 2011 to the Bezirksoberliga Schwaben. In the later years of the league the runners-up were also given the opportunity to earn promotion by playing a promotion round with the runners-up of the southern division and the three Bezirksligas from Upper Bavaria.

The bottom three teams of each group find themselves relegated to one of the six Kreisligas. At the same time the six Kreisliga winners are promoted to the Bezirksliga. The runners-up of those face a play-off with each other and the 13th placed teams in the Bezirksliga.

The area covered by the Swabian FA is not identical with the Bezirk Schwaben, there is a large number of clubs from Upper Bavaria playing in Swabia, especially in the north. On the other hand, a large number of clubs from the west of Swabia play in the Württemberg football leagues, like the SpVgg Au/Iller and SpVgg Lindau.

The Bezirksliga Schwaben-Süd is feed by the following Kreisligas.

- Kreisliga Schwaben-Süd
- Kreisliga Schwaben-Mitte
- Kreisliga Schwaben-Augsburg

With the league reform at the end of the 2011–12 season, which included an expansion of the number of Landesligas from three to five, the Bezirksoberligas were disbanded. Instead, the Bezirksligas took the place of the Bezirksoberligas once more below the Landesligas.

The following qualifying modus applied at the end of the 2011–12 season:

- Champions: Promotion round to the Landesliga, winners to the Landesliga, losers to the Bezirksliga.
- Teams placed 2nd to 7th: Remain in the Bezirksliga.
- Teams placed 8th to 13th: Three additional Bezirksliga places to be determined in a play-off round, winners to the Bezirksliga, losers to the Kreisliga.
- Teams placed 14th to 16th: Directly relegated to Kreisliga.

=== League timeline ===
The league went through the following timeline of name changes, format and position in the league system:

Years	Name	Tier	Promotion to
1963–68	Bezirksliga Schwaben	V	Landesliga Bayern-Süd
1968–88	Bezirksliga Schwaben-Süd	V	Landesliga Bayern-Süd
1988–94	Bezirksliga Schwaben-Süd	VI	Bezirksoberliga Schwaben
1994–2008	Bezirksliga Schwaben-Süd	VII	Bezirksoberliga Schwaben
2008–12	Bezirksliga Schwaben-Süd	VIII	Bezirksoberliga Schwaben
2012–	Bezirksliga Schwaben-Süd	VII	Landesliga Bayern-Südwest

== League champions ==
The following teams have won the league:

Season	Club
1963–64	TSV 1861 Nördlingen
1964–65	BSK Neugablonz
1965–66	Schwaben Augsburg II
1966–67	BC Aichach
1967–68	TSV Schwabmünchen
1968–69	TSV Haunstetten
1969–70	FC Kempten
1970–71	TSV Landsberg
1971–72	TSV Haunstetten
1972–73	SV Ober-Germaringen
1973–74	Olympia Neugablonz
1974–75	Schwaben Augsburg
1975–76	TSV Göggingen
1976–77	TSV Haunstetten
1977–78	TSV Marktoberdorf
1978–79	TSV Mindelheim
1979–80	Salamander Türkheim
1980–81	TSV Marktoberdorf
1981–82	FC Kempten

Season	Club
1982–83	SV Ober-Germaringen
1983–84	TSV Mindelheim
1984–85	SpVgg Günz-Lauben
1985–86	TSV Landsberg
1986–87	FC Kempten
1987–88	TSV Königsbrunn
1988–89	TSV Bobingen
1989–90	VfL Kaufering
1990–91	TSV Kottern
1991–92	FC Enikon Augsburg
1992–93	DJK Lechhausen
1993–94	TSV Marktoberdorf
1994–95	TSV Göggingen
1995–96	FC Heimertingen
1996–97	TSV Leitershofen
1997–98	1. FC Sonthofen
1998–99	TSV Neusäß
1999–2000	ASV Fellheim
2000–01	TSV Betzigau

Season	Club
2001–02	TSV Babenhausen
2002–03	FC Augsburg II
2003–04	FC Memmingen II
2004–05	TSV Haunstetten
2005–06	TSV Schwabmünchen
2006–07	TSV Landsberg
2007–08	TSV Mindelheim
2008–09	BC Oberhausen
2009–10	TSV Babenhausen
2010–11	SV Mering
2011–12	Türk Spor Augsburg
2012–13	TSV Friedberg
2013–14	SV Egg
2014–15	Türk Spor Augsburg
2015–16	Schwaben Augsburg
2016–17	TV Bad Grönenbach
2017–18	FC Kempten
2018–19	VfB Durach
2019–21	SV Cosmos Aystetten

- League title from 1963 to 1968 are for the single-division Bezirkliga Schwaben.
- With TSV Landsberg in 1971, 1986 and 2007 and VfL Kaufering in 1990 four titles went to clubs from Oberbayern.
- In 2020, the season was suspended and then extended to 2021, when it was curtailed. Cosmos Aystetten was ranked on a points per game basis.

=== Multiple winners ===
The following clubs have won the league more than once:

Club	Wins	Years
FC Kempten	4	1970, 1982, 1987, 2018
TSV Haunstetten	4	1969, 1972, 1977, 2005
TSV Mindelheim	3	1979, 1984, 2008
TSV Landsberg	3	1971, 1986, 2007
TSV Göggingen ^{1}	3	1976, 1984, 1995
TSV Marktoberdorf	3	1971, 1978, 1994
Türk Spor Augsburg	2	2012, 2015
TSV Neusäß ^{1}	2	1999, 2012
TSV Babenhausen	2	2002, 2010
TSV Schwabmünchen	2	1968, 2006
FC Augsburg II ^{1}	2	1976, 2003
SV Ober-Germaringen	2	1973, 1983
BSK Neugablonz	2	1965, 1974

- Northern division titles in italics.
- ^{1} FC Augsburg II, TSV Neusäß and the TSV Göggingen are the only three teams to have won both Bezirksligas, Nord and Süd.

== Current clubs ==
The clubs in the league in the 2021–22 season and their 2019–21 final placings:

Club	Position
SpVgg Kaufbeuren	Relegated from the Landesliga Südwest
TV Erkheim	2nd
BSK Neugablonz	3rd
TV Bad Grönenbach	4th
Türkgücü Königsbrunn	5th
FC Thalhofen	6th
FC Heimertingen	7th
TSV Bobingen	8th
VfL Kaufering	9th
TSV Ottobeuren	10th
TSV Babenhausen	11th
TG Viktoria Augsburg	12th
TSV Haunstetten	13th
TSV Mindelheim	Promoted from the Kreisliga
FC Oberstdorf	Promoted from the Kreisliga
