= Furkan Kircicek =

German footballer (born 1996)

Personal information
- Date of birth: 28 September 1996 (age 30)
- Place of birth: Füssen, Germany
- Height: 1.79 m (5 ft 10 in)
- Position: Forward

Team information
- Current team: TSV Landsberg
- Number: 19

Senior career*
Years	Team	Apps	(Gls)
2014–2015	SpVgg Kaufbeuren	31	(7)
2015–2017	FC Memmingen II	32	(15)
2015–2019	FC Memmingen	90	(28)
2019–2021	Türkgücü München	41	(4)
2021–2023	Chemnitzer FC	52	(11)
2023–2024	FV Illertissen	30	(4)
2025–	TSV Landsberg	27	(15)
- * Club domestic league appearances and goals as of 24 September 2026

Furkan Kircicek (born 28 September 1996) is a German professional footballer who plays as a forward for TSV Landsberg.

== Career ==
Kircicek signed for Türkgücü München on a free transfer from FC Memmingen in the summer of 2019. He made his 3. Liga debut for Türkgücü München on 19 September 2020 as a substitute in a 2–2 draw away to FC Bayern Munich II. He signed for Chemnitzer FC in June 2021 on a contract of undisclosed length.
