= Branko Milosevic =

Australian soccer player

Branko Milošević
Personal information
- Full name: Branko Milošević
- Date of birth: 21 August 1964 (age 62)
- Place of birth: Osijek, SFR Yugoslavia
- Height: 1.76 m (5 ft 9 in)
- Position: Attacking midfielder

Youth career
- 1975–1981: Olimpija Osijek

Senior career*
Years	Team	Apps	(Gls)
1982	Dinamo Zagreb	2	(0)
1983	SpVgg Au/Iller	24	(16)
1984–1986	SSV Ulm 1846	73	(22)
1987–1991	Melbourne Knights	128	(28)
1991–1995	Sydney Olympic	95	(19)
1995–1999	West Adelaide	80	(9)
2009	Adelaide Olympic	7	(0)
Total		378	(79)

International career
1990–1993	Australia	11	(1)
1991–1993	Australia XI	4	(0)

Managerial career
- 2000–2002: Adelaide Olympic
- 2005–2008: Adelaide Raiders
- 2010–2011: Adelaide Olympic
- 2012: Adelaide Raiders
- 2014–2017: Adelaide Olympic
- * Club domestic league appearances and goals

Branko Milosevic (born 21 August 1964) is a Croatian-Australian football midfielder who made several appearances for the Socceroos.

== Club career ==
=== Europe ===
Born in Osijek, SR Croatia, SFR Yugoslavia, Branko Milosevic played for Olimpija Osijek as a junior and later was picked up by NK Dinamo Zagreb, where he played with the likes of Zvonimir Boban in the Yugoslav First League. Branko left Zagreb shortly after arriving and moved to Germany, where he played for SpVgg Au/Iller and SSV Ulm 1846 between 1983 and 1986.

=== Australia ===
Milosevic came to Australia in 1987 and played for Croatian side Melbourne Croatia (Melbourne Knights). He was an instant star and arguably the best player in the NSL. He left Melbourne Knights in 1991 to move to Sydney Olympic FC. He had a great first season and Eddie Thompson, who was managing the Socceroos at the time, had marked him as his player of the year. Milosevic finished runner up in the Johnny Warren medal as he did a few years back while at Melbourne Knights. He left Sydney Olympic FC in 1995 after Coach David Ratcliffe dropped the midfielder. West Adelaide were quick to offer and brought Milosevic to Adelaide. After a couple of seasons at West Adelaide, Milosevic was able to change his game style and play as sweeper, despite being in his mid 30s. He was appointed captain of West Adelaide in 1997. Milosevic announced his retirement from the NSL in 1999 after the West Adelaide announced that they were pulling out of theleague due to a financial crisis. 10 years later, Milosevic made his comeback to play for Adelaide Olympic in 2009 and won the premier league player of the year at 45 years of age, despite only playing 7 games. During the 2009 campaign, Milosevic and his son became the first father and son to play together in the same team in the premier league.

== International career ==
Milosevic made his Australian debut against South Korea in 1990. He made 15 appearances (4 unofficial) and scored 1 goal. Milosevic scored against New Zealand in 1991, and North Korea in 1992.

== Coaching career ==
Milosevic took up his first job as manager to Adelaide Olympic in 2000, where he was player/coach in the Premier League (2nd division), they won the league undefeated and were promoted into the Super League (1st division). The following year he finished 6th in the Super League and 6th again in 2002. Milosevic then coached the SA state teams for a couple years before joining Adelaide Raiders in 2005, where in his first year, he finished 2nd in the league and 2nd in the league cup losing out to rivals White City in extra time.

After making his comeback to soccer in 2009 for Adelaide Olympic as player/assistant coach, the club appointed Milosevic as the head coach for the 2010 season.
