= TSV Landsberg =

German football club

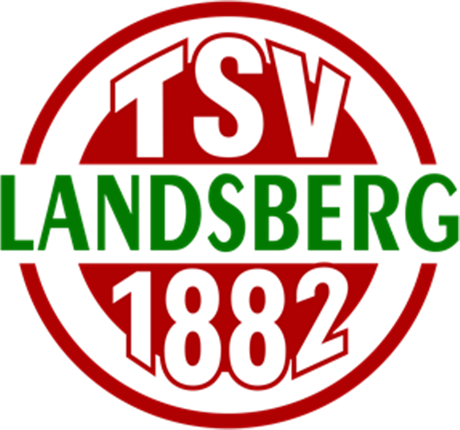
- Full name: Turn- und Sportverein 1882 Landsberg am Lech e.V.
- Founded: 1882
- Ground: TSV-Stadion
- Capacity: 5,000
- Manager: Eddy Weiler
- League: Regionalliga Bayern (IV)
- 2025–26: Bayernliga Süd 2nd of 18 (promoted)
Home colours	Away colours

TSV Landsberg is a German association football club from the town of Landsberg am Lech, Bavaria. The club's greatest success has been winning promotion to the Bayernliga on two occasions, in 1997 and 2014.

== History ==
TSV was established in November 1882 as the gymnastics club Männerturnverein 1882 Landsberg and adopted its current name around 1918. The club's footballers went their own way in 1923 as Fußball-Club 1911 Landsberg. In 1934, FC was re-united with TSV and joined by the army club Militär-Sportverein Landsberg to create TuSpV Landsberg. After World War II occupying Allied authorities dissolved all organizations in the country, including sports and football clubs. FC and TSV were both later re-formed sometime in 1945. FC adopted the name Sportverein 1911 Landsberg in 1947 and on 31 March 1949 the club was again re-united with founding association TSV.

Throughout its existence the football team has played in lower tier local competition with the exception of a single season spent in the Oberliga Bayern (IV) in 1997–98 where the team finished at the bottom of the table. They currently play in the Bezirksoberliga Schwaben (VI) after slipping from the Landesliga Bayern-Süd (V) all the way to the Bezirksliga Schwaben-Süd (VII), gaining promotion from this league in 2006–07.

In the 2007–08 season, the TSV finished at a secure eight place in the Bezirksoberliga, the season after, it earned promotion back to the Landesliga, finishing second and beating TSV Eching 3–0 in a promotion decider. At the end of the 2011–12 season the club qualified for the promotion round to the newly expanded Bayernliga. A first round loss to FC Affing however meant the club remained in the Landesliga instead. Landsberg won the Landesliga Bayern-Südwest in 2014 and earned promotion to the Bayernliga for a second time.

Today's sports club has departments for Aikido, baseball, dance, gymnastics, handball, hiking, Karate, table tennis, and volleyball.

Geographically, the club is placed in Oberbayern but due to being very close to Schwaben, it plays in the Schwaben football league system.

== Current squad ==
As of 8 September 2026

Note: Flags indicate national team as defined under FIFA eligibility rules; some limited exceptions apply. Players may hold more than one non-FIFA nationality.

No.	Pos.	Nation	Player
1	GK	GER	Leopold Leimeister
2	DF	GER	Daniel Sanchez
4	DF	SRB	Benito Ališanović
6	MF	GER	Lukas Bettrich
7	MF	GER	Daniele Sgodzaj
9	FW	GER	Jeton Abazi
10	MF	GER	Ünal Tosun
11	MF	GER	Maximilian Seemüller
13	FW	GER	Fynn Heinze
14	DF	GER	Maximilian Holdenrieder
16	MF	GER	Fabian Kljucevic
18	MF	GER	Tunahan Reis

No.	Pos.	Nation	Player
19	FW	GER	Furkan Kircicek
20	DF	GER	Leon Bucher
21	DF	GER	Kilian Pittrich
22	GK	GER	Maurice Merkl
23	MF	USA	Creighton Braun
24	DF	GER	Benedikt Kuhn
27	MF	GER	Luis Schäffler
28	MF	GER	Halit Yilmaz
29	DF	GER	David Bauer
30	MF	GER	Tiziano Mulas
37	GK	GER	Daniel Baltzer
40	GK	GER	Max Fuchs

== Honours ==
The club's honours:

=== League ===
- Landesliga Bayern-Süd (V)
  - Runner-up: 1997
- Landesliga Bayern-Südwest (VI)
  - Champions: 2014
- Bezirksoberliga Schwaben (V-VII)
  - Runners-up: (2) 1991, 2009
- Bezirksliga Schwaben-Süd (V-VII)
  - Champions: (3) 1971, 1986, 2007
  - Runners-up: 1984
- A-Klasse Schwaben-Süd (VI)
  - Champions: 1966
- A-Klasse Schwaben-Mitte (VI)
  - Champions: 1983

=== Cup ===
- Schwaben Cup
  - Runners-up: 1986

== Recent seasons ==
The recent season-by-season performance of the club:

Season	Division	Tier	Position
1963–64	B-Klasse Schwaben-Süd	VII	3rd
1964–65	B-Klasse Schwaben-Süd	VII	1st ↑
1965–66	A-Klasse Schwaben-Süd	VI	1st ↑
1966–67	Bezirksliga Schwaben	V	15th ↓
1967–68	A-Klasse Schwaben-Süd	VI	3rd ↑
1968–69	Bezirksliga Schwaben-Süd	V	11th
1969–70	Bezirksliga Schwaben-Süd	V	11th
1970–71	Bezirksliga Schwaben-Süd	V	1st ↑
1971–72	Landesliga Bayern-Süd	IV	13th
1972–73	Landesliga Bayern-Süd	IV	7th
1973–74	Landesliga Bayern-Süd	IV	11th
1974–75	Landesliga Bayern-Süd	IV	12th
1975–76	Landesliga Bayern-Süd	IV	7th
1976–77	Landesliga Bayern-Süd	IV	16th ↓
1977–78	Bezirksliga Schwaben-Süd	V	3rd
1978–79	Bezirksliga Schwaben-Süd	V	13th
1979–80	Bezirksliga Schwaben-Süd	V	13th ↓
1980–81	A-Klasse Schwaben-Mitte	VI	4th
1981–82	A-Klasse Schwaben-Mitte	VI	4th
1982–83	A-Klasse Schwaben-Mitte	VI	1st ↑
1983–84	Bezirksliga Schwaben-Süd	V	2nd
1984–85	Bezirksliga Schwaben-Süd	V	3rd
1985–86	Bezirksliga Schwaben-Süd	V	1st ↑
1986–87	Landesliga Bayern-Süd	IV	5th
1987–88	Landesliga Bayern-Süd	IV	7th
1988–89	Landesliga Bayern-Süd	IV	11th
1989–90	Landesliga Bayern-Süd	IV	15th ↓
1990–91	Bezirksoberliga Schwaben	V	2nd
1991–92	Bezirksoberliga Schwaben	V	3rd
1992–93	Bezirksoberliga Schwaben	V	3rd
1993–94	Bezirksoberliga Schwaben	V	3rd ↑

Season	Division	Tier	Position
1994–95	Landesliga Bayern-Süd	V	4th
1995–96	Landesliga Bayern-Süd	V	10th
1996–97	Landesliga Bayern-Süd	V	2nd ↑
1997–98	Bayernliga	IV	18th ↓
1998–99	Landesliga Bayern-Süd	V	18th ↓
1999–2000	Bezirksoberliga Schwaben	VI	13th
2000–01	Bezirksoberliga Schwaben	VI	4th
2001–02	Bezirksoberliga Schwaben	VI	5th
2002–03	Bezirksoberliga Schwaben	VI	4th
2003–04	Bezirksoberliga Schwaben	VI	8th
2004–05	Bezirksoberliga Schwaben	VI	12th
2005–06	Bezirksoberliga Schwaben	VI	15th ↓
2006–07	Bezirksliga Schwaben-Süd	VII	1st ↑
2007–08	Bezirksoberliga Schwaben	VI	8th
2008–09	Bezirksoberliga Schwaben	VII	2nd ↑
2009–10	Landesliga Bayern-Süd	VI	12th
2010–11	Landesliga Bayern-Süd	VI	7th
2011–12	Landesliga Bayern-Süd	VI	10th
2012–13	Landesliga Bayern-Südwest	VI	5th
2013–14	Landesliga Bayern-Südwest	VI	1st ↑
2014–15	Bayernliga Süd	V	8th
2015–16	Bayernliga Süd	V	15th
2016–17	Bayernliga Süd	V	15th
2017–18	Bayernliga Süd	V	18th ↓
2018–19	Landesliga Bayern-Südwest	VI	1st ↑
2019–20	Bayernliga Süd	V	15th
2020–21	Bayernliga Süd	V	15th
2021–22	Bayernliga Süd	V	7th
2022–23	Bayernliga Süd	V	3rd
2023–24	Bayernliga Süd	V	4th
2024–25	Bayernliga Süd	V	8th
2025–26	Bayernliga Süd	V	2nd ↑
2026–27	Regionalliga Bayern	IV	

- With the introduction of the Bezirksoberligas in 1988 as the new fifth tier, below the Landesligas, all leagues below dropped one tier. With the introduction of the Regionalligas in 1994 and the 3. Liga in 2008 as the new third tier, below the 2. Bundesliga, all leagues below dropped one tier. With the establishment of the Regionalliga Bayern as the new fourth tier in Bavaria in 2012 the Bayernliga was split into a northern and a southern division, the number of Landesligas expanded from three to five and the Bezirksoberligas abolished. All leagues from the Bezirksligas onwards were elevated one tier.

↑ Promoted	↓ Relegated

Source: "Das Fussball-Jahresjournal", an annual publication on football in Schwaben, author: Schwäbischer Fussball Verband (Schwaben FA)
Source:"History of TSV Landsberg". TSV Landsberg.
