= Creighton Braun =

American soccer player

Personal information
- Full name: Creighton Spencer Braun
- Date of birth: December 7, 2001 (age 24)
- Place of birth: Foothill Ranch, California, United States
- Height: 1.91 m (6 ft 3 in)
- Position: Defensive midfielder

Team information
- Current team: TSV Landsberg
- Number: 23

Youth career
- West Coast

Senior career*
Years	Team	Apps	(Gls)
2021	DAC Dunajská Streda	0	(0)
2021	→ ŠTK Šamorín	3	(1)
2021–2022	Bonner SC	16	(0)
2022–2023	Germania Halberstadt	29	(0)
2023–2024	Bonner SC	22	(1)
2024–2026	TSV Aubstadt	12	(0)
2026–	TSV Landsberg	4	(0)
- * Club domestic league appearances and goals as of September 24, 2026

Creighton Spencer Braun (born December 7, 2001) is an American soccer player who plays as a defender or midfielder for TSV Landsberg.

== Career ==
Before the second half of 2020–21, Braun signed for Slovak top flight side DAC Dunajská Streda after training for Schalke in the German Bundesliga. After that, he was sent on loan to Slovak second division club ŠTK Šamorín.
