= TG Viktoria Augsburg =

German football club

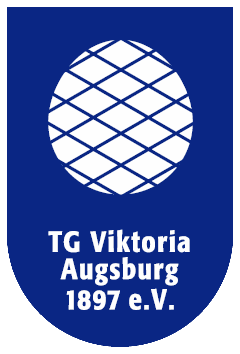
- Full name: Turngemeinschaft Viktoria Augsburg e.V.
- Founded: 22 April 1897
- Ground: Bezirkssportanlage Süd
- League: Bezirksliga Schwaben (VII)
- 2015–16: Kreisliga Schwaben-Augsburg (VIII), 1st (promoted)

TG Viktoria Augsburg is a German association football club based in the Hochfeld quarter of Augsburg, Bavaria.

== History ==
The club's roots are traced to an ancestor club ATV Augsburg which was established on 22 April 1897 and was renamed Turngemeinschaft Augsburg in 1919. In 1910 gymnasts from TV 1847 Augsburg and MTV Augsburg founded another club Fußballverein Viktoria Augsburg. FV won the Southern German cup in 1921. ATV was forced to fold in 1933 under the Nazi prohibition of faith-based and workers' clubs which were deemed politically unacceptable. Due to wartime conditions, FV closed down in 1939 and did not re-open until 1946, when it was merged with a refounded TG Augsburg to become Turngemeinschaft Viktoria Augsburg.

The footballers first came to prominence after the Second World War when they played in the then-second tier Amateurliga Bayern Süd in 1947 but were relegated after one season. In 1949 the Viktoria juniors won both the Bavarian and southern German under-19 championships, while the seniors won the 1951 and 1962 Schwaben Cups.

The club faded into obscurity in the lower Swabian leagues for the next decades, their only bright spots were promotions to the Bezirksliga Schwaben-Süd (V) in 1978 and 1984, and playing as an inaugural member of the 16-team Bezirksoberliga Schwaben (V) for one season in 1988, which ended in last place and relegation back to the Bezirksliga (VI). They slipped even further in the 1990s, once dropping into the bottom B-Klasse. By the 2000s Viktoria went up slowly from the basement level in the pyramid and in 2009 won a championship in the A-Klasse Augsburg (X) to play in the Kreisklasse Süd (IX). Another championship, this time in the Kreisklasse propelled them to the Kreisliga Augsburg (VIII) where they played until 2015–16 when a league championship took them up to the Bezirksliga.

== Other sports ==
As a larger sports club, Viktoria has other sections in athletics, basketball, fitness, fistball, and swimming. In the past it had a volleyball department, now defunct, wherein its women's team won promotion to the Bayernliga in 1971 and the double of the German championship and DVV-Pokal (German Cup) in 1985. For these wins, Viktoria played in and won the CEV Challenge Cup that same year.
