= SV Salamander Türkheim =

German football club

- Full name: Sportverein Salamander Türkheim e.V.
- Founded: 1920
- Ground: Wertachstadion
- Manager: Florian Volpert
- League: Kreisklasse (IX)
- 2015–16: Kreisliga Schwaben-Mitte (VIII), 15th (relegated)
Home colours	Away colours

The SV Salamander Türkheim is a German association football club from the town of Türkheim, Bavaria.

The club spent almost its entire history as an amateur side in the leagues of the Schwaben football league system. Salamander's most notable moment came in 1979 when, after having won the Schwaben Cup and qualified for the first round of the German Cup, the team met Bonner SC and lost 4–0 in Bonn.

In the same season, the side earned promotion to the tier-four Landesliga Bayern-Süd but lasted for only one season at this level and has remained within the leagues of Schwaben ever since.

== History ==
SV Türkheim was formed in 1920, after the First World War, and played its first game of football in August that year. After early difficulties to obtain a permanent home ground, the side merged with TV 1891 Türkheim in 1921, but the union was short-lived, with the two clubs splitting again in January 1923. In the same year, SVT entered league football in the form of the local C-Klasse, the lowest division in the region.

In the mid-1920s, the club's fortunes improved, making their third home ground in five years their temporary home and earning two promotions, to the B-Klasse in 1926 and the A-Klasse in 1929. Despite the success, the club was financially troubled but finally managed to find support in the form of the local Salamander shoe factory. For this reason, the club adopted the new name SV Salamander Türkheim in September 1930.

The club moved home grounds again in 1931, for the fourth time, now to the Römerschanze, but found itself suddenly disbanded in early 1933 when the Nazis took power and confiscated the club's financial assets and playing materials. The club's demise was however short-lived, being reinstated in April 1933. SVT won the local A-Klasse in 1937 and took out the local Memmingen area cup in the following year. With the outbreak of the Second World War, football became difficult and soon the club had to cease competing altogether.

After the war, the club remained in the A-Klasse until 1962, when it was finally relegated. It made a return to this level in 1964 and went even better in 1967, when promotion to the tier-five Bezirksliga Schwaben-Süd was achieved. Troubled by waterlogged pitches caused by the proximity of the Wertach, the club finally moved grounds once more, now to the Wertachstadion, which was opened in 1970. From there, the club entered its most successful era, reaching the final of the Schwaben Cup for the first time, where FC Augsburg proved to good, winning 3–1.

In the following years, the club finished runners-up in the Bezirksliga on two occasions, 1973 and 1976. On the wave of this success, SVT decided to build a 400-seater grand stand in 1976. In June 1979, the club reached the cup final for a second time, losing 3–5 to BSK Neugablonz but qualifying for the German Cup in the process. The side had to travel to fellow amateur side Bonner SC, where it lost 4–0. At the end of the 1979–80 season, the side stood at the top of the Bezirksliga table and earned promotion to the Landesliga, the club's greatest league success.

Salamander Türkheim's Landesliga experience was restricted to just one season. Just five wins in 34 games was not enough for survival and the club came 16th out of 18 teams and was promptly relegated, starting the decline of the side. Back in the Bezirksliga, Salamander suffered another relegation, returning to the A-Klasse.

The club briefly returned to the Bezirksliga in 1988, but could not establish itself and was relegated after two seasons again. A lack of quality players coming through from the club's own youth department and financial expanses caused, once again, by waterlogged pitches and the need for a drainage system have prevented the club from reaching former heights. After a number of years in the Kreisklasse, the club won its league in 2009 and earned promotion back to the Kreisliga, the former A-Klasse.

== Honours ==
The club's honours:

=== League ===
- Bezirksliga Schwaben-Süd
  - Champions: 1980
  - Runners-up: 1973, 1976
- Kreisklasse Mindelheim
  - Champions: 2009

=== Cup ===
- Schwaben Cup
  - Runners-up: 1971, 1979

== Recent seasons ==
The recent season-by-season performance of the club:

Season	Division	Tier	Position
2004–05	Kreisklasse Südschwaben	IX	4th
2005–06	Kreisklasse Südschwaben	IX	12th
2006–07	Kreisklasse Mindelheim	IX	7th
2007–08	Kreisklasse Mindelheim	IX	10th
2008–09	Kreisklasse Mindelheim	X	1st ↑
2009–10	Kreisliga Schwaben-Mitte	IX	11th
2010–11	Kreisliga Schwaben-Mitte	IX	3rd
2011–12	Kreisliga Schwaben-Mitte	IX	10th
2012–13	Kreisliga Schwaben-Mitte	VIII	3rd
2013–14	Kreisliga Schwaben-Mitte	VIII	4th
2014–15	Kreisliga Schwaben-Mitte	VIII	11th
2015–16	Kreisliga Schwaben-Mitte	VIII	15th ↓
2016–17	Kreisklasse	IX	

- With the introduction of the Bezirksoberligas in 1988 as the new fifth tier, below the Landesligas, all leagues below dropped one tier. With the introduction of the Regionalligas in 1994 and the 3. Liga in 2008 as the new third tier, below the 2. Bundesliga, all leagues below dropped one tier. With the establishment of the Regionalliga Bayern as the new fourth tier in Bavaria in 2012 the Bayernliga was split into a northern and a southern division, the number of Landesligas expanded from three to five and the Bezirksoberligas abolished. All leagues from the Bezirksligas onward were elevated one tier.

↑ Promoted	↓ Relegated

== DFB Cup appearance ==
SV Salamander Türkheim qualified for the first round of the German Cup just once:

Season	Round	Date	Home	Away	Result	Attendance
DFB-Pokal 1979–80	First round	26 August 1979	Bonner SC	SV Salamander Türkheim	4–0	1,100
