= SVO Germaringen =

German football club

- Founded: 1930
- Chairman: Bernhard Biechele
- League: Kreisliga Schwaben-Mitte (VIII)
- 2015–16: 5th
Home colours	Away colours

The SVO Germaringen is a German association football club from Germaringen, Bavaria.

The club's most successful era was the 1970s and early '80s, when it played in the tier-four Landesliga Bayern-Süd. More notable however is its qualification to the first round of the DFB-Pokal in this time. Qualified on three occasions, it advanced to the second round in 1976, beating fellow amateur side VfR Laboe 9–0.

Apart from football, the club has another seven sports departments, like tennis and line dance.

== History ==
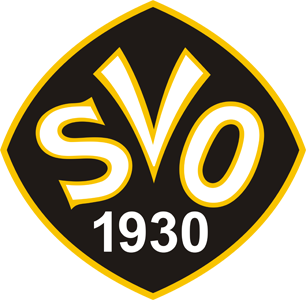
Former logo

Football was first played in organised form in Germaringen in the early 1920s, but it took until 1930 for a club to be formed, the Spielvereinigung Obergermaringen. The club, in its early days, had 32 members.

The club experienced some local success and, by 1935, reached the local Kreisliga, where it played against teams from Landsberg am Lech, Thannhausen, Mindelheim and Krumbach. With the outbreak of the Second World War, the senior team had to be withdrawn but a junior side was still successful in 1940, winning a local championship. From this side, ten of the eleven players did not return from the war.

The side was reformed in 1946 and re-entered competitive football in the local amateur leagues. In 1957, the club earned promotion to the A-Klasse, where it would play until 1971. In this era, the club's youth teams were more successful, earning to runners-up finishes in the Schwaben championship.

In 1971, the team achieved promotion to the tier-five Bezirksliga Schwaben-Süd. It stayed in this league for only two seasons before earning another championship and moving up to the Landesliga Bayern-Süd.

In its first season there, the team finished in twelfth place, nine points clear of a relegation rank. For the duration of its league membership, the club finished in the lower half of the table, but nevertheless survived there for eight seasons. In 1980, a seventeenth place however meant relegation.

In 1976, the team reached the final of the Schwaben Cup for the first time, losing 3–2 to FC Memmingen. It then beat SV Brunnthal 3–2 to qualify for the first round of the DFB-Pokal for the first time. There, the team defeated fellow amateur side VfR Laboe 9–0, a result more common in games between professional and amateur sides. In the second round of the Cup it lost 6–0 to Arminia Bielefeld.

The club returned to the Schwaben Cup final in 1978, where it lost to SSV Glött on penalties. Qualified for the first round of the DFB-Pokal once more, the team went out to VfR Bürstadt after a 7–1 loss.

The club made a third appearance in the national cup competition when it won the Schwaben Cup with a 2–1 over TSV 1861 Nördlingen in 1982 and then qualified after defeating SV Bütthard 4–1. It met Hammer SpVgg in the first round of the DFB-Pokal and lost 2–1.

The team made a return to the Landesliga in 1983. It achieved its best-ever finish there in the following season, coming eighth. This time around, the club only lasted for three seasons in the league, suffering relegation in 1986.

When, in 1988, the Bezirksoberligas were formed in Bavaria as the new fifth tier of the Bavarian football league system, SVO managed to qualify for the new Bezirksoberliga Schwaben.

After a fifth place in its first season there, 1989–90 brought almost a return to the Landesliga. Finishing on equal points at the top of the table with TSG Thannhausen, the side lost a decider and then also lost in the following promotion round.

A number of seasons with mid-table finishes followed but, in 1995, the club was relegated back to the Bezirksliga, ironically alongside TSG Thannhausen, and also TSG Augsburg.

After a number of season spend at Bezirksliga level, it returned to the Bezirksoberliga in 1999. In four seasons there, it could not break into the upper half of the table and was relegated back to the Bezirksliga in 2003, where it still plays as of today.

For the club's 75th anniversary, it invited the 1. FC Nürnberg, who it lost to 8–0 in front of 1,800 spectators.

The club came fourteenth in the Bezirksliga in 2014–15 and was relegated to the Kreisliga for the first time in 45 years.

For the 2017–18 season, the fielded eighteen separate football teams in senior and youth football, one more than in the previous season, and a new club record. SVO has three senior teams in the Schwaben football league system, one in the Kreisliga Alläu Mitte, one in the Kreisklasse and a third in the B-Klasse. Most clubs in Schwaben only field two senior teams.

== Honours ==
The club's honours:

=== League ===
- Bezirksoberliga Schwaben (V)
  - Runners-up: 1990
- Bezirksliga Schwaben-Süd (V)
  - Champions: (2) 1973, 1983
  - Runners-up: 1999

=== Cup ===
- Schwaben Cup
  - Winners: 1982
  - Runners-up: (2) 1976, 1978

=== Indoor ===
- Bavarian championship
  - Runners-up: 1992
- Schwaben championship
  - Winners: 1992
  - Runners-up: 1988

== Recent seasons ==
The recent season-by-season performance of the club: <

Season	Division	Tier	Position
1999–2000	Bezirksoberliga Schwaben	VI	12th
2000–01	Bezirksoberliga Schwaben	VI	10th
2001–02	Bezirksoberliga Schwaben	VI	13th
2002–03	Bezirksoberliga Schwaben	VI	14th ↓
2003–04	Bezirksliga Schwaben-Süd	VII	5th
2004–05	Bezirksliga Schwaben-Süd	VII	7th
2005–06	Bezirksliga Schwaben-Süd	VII	8th
2006–07	Bezirksliga Schwaben-Süd	VII	11th
2007–08	Bezirksliga Schwaben-Süd	VII	11th
2008–09	Bezirksliga Schwaben-Süd	VIII	10th
2009–10	Bezirksliga Schwaben-Süd	VIII	10th
2010–11	Bezirksliga Schwaben-Süd	VIII	7th
2011–12	Bezirksliga Schwaben-Süd	VIII	5th
2012–13	Bezirksliga Schwaben-Süd	VII	4th
2013–14	Bezirksliga Schwaben-Süd	VII	8th
2014–15	Bezirksliga Schwaben-Süd	VII	14th ↓
2015–16	Kreisliga Schwaben-Mitte	VIII	5th
2016–17	Kreisliga Allgäu-Mitte	VIII	5th
2017–18	Kreisliga Allgäu-Mitte		

- With the introduction of the Bezirksoberligas in 1988 as the new fifth tier, below the Landesligas, all leagues below dropped one tier. With the introduction of the Regionalligas in 1994 and the 3. Liga in 2008 as the new third tier, below the 2. Bundesliga, all leagues below dropped one tier. With the establishment of the Regionalliga Bayern as the new fourth tier in Bavaria in 2012 the Bayernliga was split into a northern and a southern division, the number of Landesligas expanded from three to five and the Bezirksoberligas abolished. All leagues from the Bezirksligas onwards were elevated one tier.

↑ Promoted	↓ Relegated

== Friendlies ==
The club has played a number of friendlies in the past against top-teams from Europe and South America:

- 25 July 1982: Fortuna Düsseldorf 0–0
- 28 July 1983: Eintracht Frankfurt 0–3
- 25 July 1984: FC Twente Enschede 0–4
- 27 July 1984: Arminia Bielefeld 0–3
- 24 July 1985: HFC Haarlem 2–4
- 17 July 1986: Alkmaar Zaanstreek 0–3
- 23 July 1986: VfL Bochum 2–4
- 3 July 1987: Ajax Amsterdam 1–1
- 4 August 1987: Gremio Porto Alegre 0–4
- 22 January 1989: FC Swarovski Tirol 10–4
- 13 July 1990: 1. FC Lok Leipzig 1–4
- 2 July 2005: 1. FC Nürnberg 0–8
- 19 October 2007: FC Bayern Allstars 5–4

== DFB-Pokal appearances ==
The club has qualified for the first round of the DFB-Pokal three times:

Season	Round	Date	Home	Away	Result	Attendance
1976–77 DFB-Pokal	First round	6 August 1976	SVO Germaringen	VfR Laboe	9–0	
1976–77 DFB-Pokal	Second round	16 October 1976	Arminia Bielefeld	SVO Germaringen	6–0	
1978–79 DFB-Pokal	First round	5 August 1978	SVO Germaringen	VfR 1910 Bürstadt	1–7	
1982–83 DFB-Pokal	First round	27 August 1983	SVO Germaringen	Hammer SpVgg	1–2	

Source:"DFB-Pokal". worldfootball.net.
