= Landesliga Bayern-Südwest =

- Founded: 2012
- Country: Germany
- State: Bavaria
- Number of clubs: 18
- Level on pyramid: Level 6
- Promotion to: Bayernliga
- Relegation to: Bezirksliga
- Current champions: 1. FC Sonthofen; (2022–23)

The Landesliga Bayern-Südwest (English: State league Bavaria-Southwest) is currently the sixth tier of the German football league system in south western Bavaria and the third tier of the Bavarian football league system.

It is one of five Landesligas in Bavaria, the other four being the Landesliga Südost, Landesliga Mitte, Landesliga Nordost and Landesliga Nordwest. The league champion automatically qualifies for the Bayernliga, the runners-up needs to compete with the runners-up of the other four Landesligas and a number of Bayernliga teams for another promotion spot.

The league replaced the Landesliga Bayern-Süd at this level, with the former having existed from 1963 to 2012. However, while the Landesliga Süd covered all of Bavarian Swabia and Upper Bavaria the new league only covers Bavarian Swabia and western Upper Bavaria.

== History ==
=== Formation ===
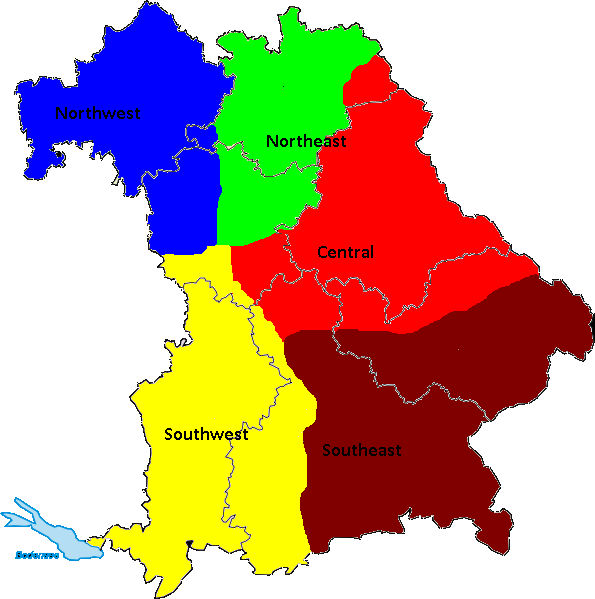
The Landesligas from 2012 onwards.

The Bavarian Football Association carried out drastic changes to the league system at the end of the 2011–12 season. With the already decided introduction of the Regionalliga Bayern from 2012–13, it also placed two Bayernligas below the new league as the new fifth tier of the German league system, splitting the previously single division league into a northern and a southern group. Below those, five Landesligas instead of the existing three were set, which were geographically divided to limit travel and increase the number of local derbies.

Clubs from three different league tiers were able to qualify for the new league. From the Landesliga level, specifically the Landesliga Bayern-Süd, the clubs placed ninth to 15th had the opportunity to qualify for the Bayernliga through play-offs. Those clubs who failed to qualify for the Bayernliga were grouped in the Landesliga. The Landesliga clubs placed 16th, 17th and 18th automatically went to the Landesliga. The Bezirksoberliga (BOL) champions also had the chance to qualify for the Bayernliga. Those clubs who failed went to the Landesliga, alongside the BOL teams placed second to sixth. The teams placed seventh to tenth in Swabia and seventh to twelfth in Upper Bavaria entered a play-off with the Bezirksliga champions for the remaining Landesliga spots. The regulations also allowed for Bavarian clubs playing outside the Bavarian league system to join the Landesliga should they fulfil the qualifying norms. As FV Illertissen, playing in the Oberliga Baden-Württemberg, opted to join the new Regionalliga Bayern its reserve side, finishing fourth in the Landesliga Württemberg 2, was allowed to enter the Landesliga Südwest.

The league started out with 18 clubs in its inaugural season, the clubs coming from the following leagues:

- From the Landesliga Bayern-Süd (VI): TSV Landsberg, FC Pipinsried, FC Gundelfingen, VfB Durach, TSG Thannhausen
- From the Bezirksoberliga Schwaben (VII): SV Mering, TSV 1861 Nördlingen, TSV Mindelheim, SpVgg Kaufbeuren, TSV Ottobeuren, TSV Bobingen, FC Memmingen II, FC Königsbrunn
- From the Bezirksoberliga Oberbayern (VII): FC Gerolfing, SV Manching, SV Raisting
- From the Landesliga Württemberg 2 (VII): FV Illertissen II
- From the Bezirksliga Oberbayern-Nord (VIII): TSV 1865 Dachau

=== Seasons ===
The opening game of the new league took place on 20 July 2012 when TSV Mindelheim hosted TSV Ottobeuren and won 4-1. At the end of the 2012–13 season, league champions FC Pipinsried were directly promoted while runners-up SV Raisting earned promotion via the promotion round. At the other end of the table, TSV Mindelheim, SV Manching and FC Königsbrunn were directly relegated, while FC Memmingen II and TSV Bobingen had to enter the promotion/relegation round with the Bezirksliga runners-up. Bobingen was relegated after losing to SV Türkgücü-Ataspor München while Memmingen maintained its league place after overcoming TSV Wertingen. For the 2013–14 season the league received four of the five teams relegated from the Bayernliga Süd in 2013, TSV Aindling, TSV Gersthofen, SC Fürstenfeldbruck and TSV Kottern. Additionally, four clubs were promoted to the league, SC Bubesheim, TSV Friedberg, SC Oberweikertshofen and Sportfreunde Dinkelsbühl, with the later becoming the first Middle Franconian team to enter the league. Apart from the four relegated sides the league also lost TSV Dachau and FC Gerolfing who moved to the Südost division after the 2012–13 season.

The 2019–20 season was interrupted by the coronavirus disease pandemic in Germany that began in March 2020. It was later suspended until 31 August, forcing a cancellation of the 2020–21 season as the BFV approved a resumption of the preceding one, which was curtailed in May 2021.

== Modus ==
The league is played in a home-and-away format with the league champion being directly promoted to the Bayernliga. The runners-up enters a promotion round with the other four Landesliga runners-up and the Bayernliga teams placed just above the direct relegation ranks, 15th and 16th in the south and 15th in the north, for additional spots in this league. For 2016–17, the bottom (i.e., 17th) team from the Landesliga is directly relegated to the Bezirksligas. The teams placed 15th to 16th have to play-off with the Bezirksliga runners-up for their place in the Landesliga.

== Top-three of the Landesliga ==
The following teams have finished in the top-three in the league:

Season	Champions	Runners-up	Third
2012–13	FC Pipinsried	**SV Raisting**	FV Illertissen II
2013–14	TSV Landsberg	TSV 1861 Nördlingen	FV Illertissen II
2014–15	TSV Kottern	FV Illertissen II	FC Gundelfingen
2015–16	FC Gundelfingen	SV Mering	TSV 1861 Nördlingen
2016–17	TSV Schwaben Augsburg	Türkspor Augsburg	FV Illertissen II
2017–18	TSV 1861 Nördlingen	FV Illertissen II	FC Memmingen II
2018–19	TSV Landsberg	**Türkspor Augsburg**	SC Ichenhausen
2019–21	FC Gundelfingen	1. FC Sonthofen	VfR Neuburg
2021–22	TSV 1861 Nördlingen	1. FC Sonthofen	TSV Gilching/Argelsried

- Promoted teams in **bold**.
- The 2019–20 season was suspended and later extended to 2021, when it was curtailed and the top were determined on a points per game basis.

== League placings ==
The complete list of clubs and placings in the league since inception in 2012:

Club	13	14	15	16	17	18	19	20	21	22	23
TSV Schwabmünchen	**B**	**B**	**B**	**B**	**B**	**B**	**B**	**B**	**B**	**B**	x
FC Pipinsried	**1**	**B**	**B**	**B**	**B**	**B**	**R**	**R**	**B**	**B**	**B**
TSV 1865 Dachau	7	**1**^{†}	**B**	**B**	**B**	**B**	**B**	**B**	**B**	**B**	**B**
TSV Kottern	**B**	5	**1**	**B**	**B**	**B**	**B**	**B**	**B**	**B**	**B**
TSV Schwaben Augsburg					**1**	**B**	**B**	**B**	**B**	**B**	**B**
TSV 1861 Nördlingen	8	2	5	3	6	**1**	**B**	**B**	**B**	**1**	**B**
TSV Landsberg	5	**1**	**B**	**B**	**B**	**B**	**1**	**B**	**B**	**B**	**B**
Türkspor Augsburg				11	2	10	2	**B**	**B**	**B**	**B**
FC Gundelfingen	4	8	4	**1**	**B**	9	12	1	**1**	**B**	**B**
1. FC Sonthofen	**B**	**B**	**B**	**B**	**B**	**B**	**B**	3	2	2	x
TSV Gilching/Argelsried					14	4	13	13	14	3	x
SC Ichenhausen			6	10	4	7	3	12	11	4	
FV Illertissen II	3	3	2	7	3	2	9	8	8	5	x
SV Mering	6	4	3	2	10	5	11	6	9	6	x
VfB Durach	11	9	16					16	15	7	x
TSV 1860 Weißenburg										7 ^{#}	x
FC Kempten							10	7	6	8	x
TuS Geretsried				9^{†}	8^{†}	5 ^{†}	7	4	5	9	x ^{†}
FC Ehekirchen					16			9	10	10	x
TSV Gersthofen	**B**	14	18							11	x
SC Olching					7	13	6	17	16	12	x
FC Memmingen II	14	6	10	6	9	3	5	11	12	13	x
1. FC Garmisch-Partenkirchen							17	5	4	14	
SV Egg an der Günz			7	5	5	12	8	10	7	15	
SV Bad Heilbrunn								14	13	16	
VfR Neuburg							4	2	3	17	
SV Cosmos Aystetten						8	16			18	
TSV Jetzendorf								15	17		x
TuS Feuchtwangen				16		6^{∞}	14^{∞}	17^{#}	17^{#}		
SpVgg Kaufbeuren	13	11	8	12	11	11	14	18	18		
BCF Wolfratshausen	**B**	**B**	**B**	**B**	**B**	**B**	15				
SC Oberweikertshofen		12	9	4	15	6	18				x
SV Raisting	2	**B**	**B**	9	13	14					
TSV Aindling	**B**	16	12	8	8	15					
FC Stätzling					12	16					
TV Bad Grönenbach						17					
Kissinger SC				13	17						
SV Manching	17			14^{†}							
TSV Meitingen				14							
SC Fürstenfeldbruck	**B**	7	11	15							
FC Gerolfing	9	9^{†}	12^{†}	15^{†}							
Sportfreunde Dinkelsbühl		10	14	17							
SV Planegg-Krailling			13	17^{†}							
TSV Ottobeuren	12	13	15								
FC Affing	**B**	**B**	17								
TSG Thannhausen	10	15									
SC Bubesheim		17									
TSV Friedberg		18									
TSV Bobingen	15										
TSV Mindelheim	16										
FC Königsbrunn	18										
TV Erkheim											x
TSV Hollenbach											x
VfL Kaufering											x
SpVgg Unterhaching II	**B**	**B**	**B**								x

- Placings for 2020 were based on the table at the point of suspension during the coronavirus pandemic. Final placings were after the curtailment of the resumed 2019–20 season in 2021.

=== Key ===
Symbol	Key
**R**	Regionalliga Bayern
**B**	Bayernliga
**1**	League champions
Place	League
Place^{#}	Played in the Northeast division that season.
Place^{∞}	Played in the Northwest division that season.
Place^{†}	Played in the Southeast division that season.
Blank	Played at a league level below this league
