= Kreisliga Schwaben-Augsburg =

- Country: Germany
- State: Bavaria
- Number of clubs: 15
- Level on pyramid: Level 8
- Promotion to: Bezirksliga Süd
- Relegation to: Kreisklasse Augsburg-Mitte; Kreisklasse Augsburg-Nordwest; Kreisklasse Augsburg-Süd
- Current champions: FC Horgau (2019–21)

The Kreisliga Schwaben-Augsburg is currently the eighth tier of the German football league system in the Augsburg region of the Bavarian Regierungsbezirk of Swabia (German: Schwaben). Until the disbanding of the Bezirksoberliga Schwaben in 2012 it was the ninth tier. From 2008, when the 3. Liga was introduced, was the eighth tier of the league system, until the introduction of the Regionalligas in 1994 the seventh tier.

== Overview ==
The winner of the Kreisliga Schwaben-Augsburg, like the winner of the Kreisliga Schwaben-Mitte and the Kreisliga Schwaben-Süd, is directly promoted to the Bezirksliga Schwaben-Süd. The second placed teams out of those leagues and the 13th placed team out of the Bezirksliga play-off for the last spot there.

The teams relegated from the Kreisliga have to step down to the Kreisklasse. The Kreisliga Schwaben-Augsburg is fed by the Kreisklasses Schwaben-Augsburg-Mitte, Schwaben-Augsburg-Nordwest and Schwaben-Augsburg-Süd.

Until 1998, the Kreisliga Augsburg was called A-Klasse Augsburg. Until 2006, reserve teams of clubs in the league had to enter a parallel reserves division without promotion or relegation but have since been allowed to join the regular league system.

== League champions ==
The league champions since 1993 were:

Season	Club
1992–93	Kissinger SC
1993–94	TSV Schwabmünchen
1994–95	BC Rinnenthal
1995–96	Türk SV Augsburg
1996–97	SV Hammerschmiede
1997–98	SSV Anhausen
1998–99	TSV Usterbach
1999–2000	SV Hammerschmiede
2000–01	VfL Kaufering
2001–02	FC Augsburg II
2002–03	SV Schwabegg
2003–04	Kissinger SC
2004–05	SF Friedberg
2005–06	CS Conca D'Oro Augsburg

Season	Club
2006–07	SSV Margertshausen
2007–08	BC Oberhausen Augsburg
2008–09	Kissinger SC
2009–10	VfL Kaufering
2010–11	Stadtwerke SV Augsburg
2011–12	TSV Haunstetten
2012–13	Kissinger SC
2013–14	SV Cosmos Aystetten
2014–15	Stadtwerke SV Augsburg
2015–16	TG Viktoria Augsburg
2016–17	VfL Kaufering
2017–18	Türkgücü Königsbrunn
2018–19	TSV Haunstetten
2019–21	FC Horgau

== Current clubs ==
The clubs in the league in the 2021–22 season and their 2019–21 final positions:

Club	Position
TSV Neusäß	Relegated from the Bezirksliga
TSV Dinkelscherben	2nd
SpVgg Langerringen	3rd
Kissinger SC	4th
SSV Anhausen	5th
TSV Zusmarshausen	6th
TSV Göggingen	7th
SpVgg Lagerlechfeld	8th
SpVgg Westheim	9th
FC Königsbrunn	10th
FC Haunstetten	11th
TSV Schwabmünchen II	12th
FC Emersacker	Promoted from the Kreisklasse
TSV Königsbrunn	Promoted from the Kreisklasse
TSV Pfersee	Promoted from the Kreisklasse
