= 1. FC Sonthofen =

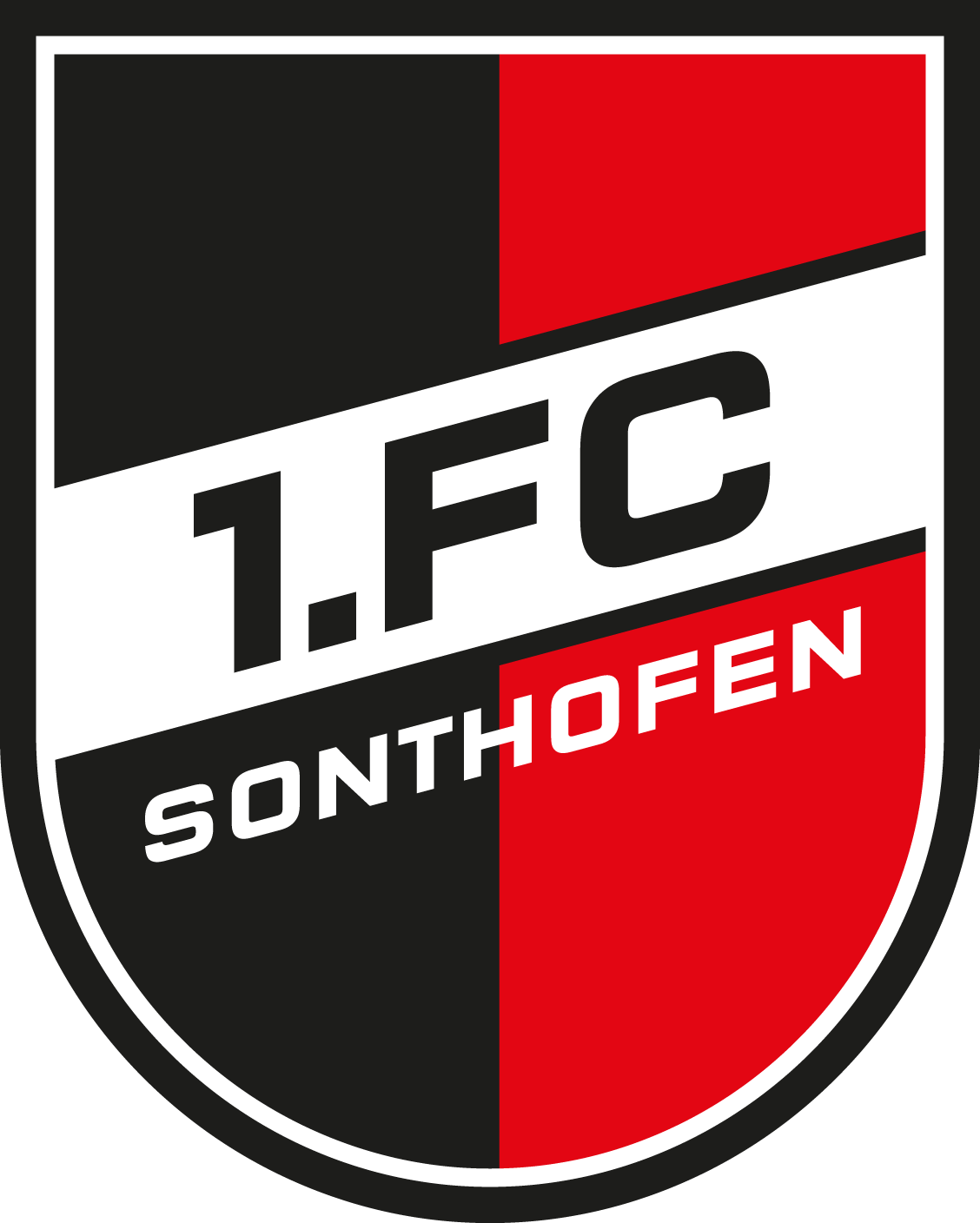
- Full name: 1. Fußball-Club Sonthofen 1919 e.V.
- Founded: 1919
- Ground: Werbe Blank Sports Arena
- Chairman: Josi Kreuzhagen
- Manager: Esad Kahric
- League: Landesliga Bayern-Südwest (VI)
- 2024–25: Bayernliga Süd, 15th of 17 (relegated via play-offs)
Home colours	Away colours

1. FC Sonthofen (officially 1. Fußball-Club Sonthofen 1919 e.V.) is a German association football club from the town of Sonthofen, Bavaria.

The club's greatest success came in 2012 when it qualified for the new southern division of the expanded Fußball-Bayernliga, the fifth tier of the German football league system.

== History ==
For most of its history the club has been a non-describt amateur side in local Bavarian football. Formed as the football department of local multi sports club TSV Sonthofen, formed in 1863, the team left the mother club in 1984 to play as 1. FC Sonthofen.

In 1988 the club was instrumental in the establishing of the Bezirksoberligas in Bavaria, their introduction being suggested by the club in 1986. Despite this, the club did not initially manage to qualify for the new league it had proposed, taking a decade, until 1998, to do so.

Sonthofen spent its next decade fluctuating between the Bezirksliga Schwaben-Süd and the Kreisliga Schwaben-Süd (1992–95) below it until a league title in the Bezirksliga in 1998 final took it up to the Bezirksoberliga. The club spent the next nine seasons at this level, generally finishing in the upper half of the table. Eventually, in 1998, Sonthofen managed to win the league and move out of the league system of Bavarian Swabia for the first time.

For the first time in the Landesliga Bayern-Süd, 1. FCS came tenth in the league in 2008, while also winning the Schwaben Cup for the first and only time, but going out in the quarter finals of the Bavarian Cup against SpVgg Landshut and thereby missing out on qualification to the German Cup. The following season the club finished in ninth place in the league. The 2009–10 season however proved a setback for the club, finishing 16th and suffering relegation back to the Bezirksoberliga., Back at this level the club came third in 2011, a result that, exceptionally, allowed it promotion back to the Landesliga.

Back in the Landesliga the club came fifth in 2012, a result that allowed it to comfortably qualify for the new southern division of the Bayernliga, where it plays in since the 2012–13 season.

== Honours ==
The club's honours:

=== League ===
- Bezirksoberliga Schwaben
  - Champions: 2007
- Bezirksliga Schwaben-Süd
  - Champions: 1998
- Kreisliga Schwaben-Süd
  - Champions: 1995, 2008^{†}

=== Cup ===
- Schwaben Cup
  - Winners: 2008
  - Runners-up: 1949

- ^{†} Denotes won by reserve team.

== Recent seasons ==
The recent season-by-season performance of the club:

Season	Division	Tier	Position
1999–2000	Bezirksoberliga Schwaben	VI	7th
2000–01	Bezirksoberliga Schwaben	VI	6th
2001–02	Bezirksoberliga Schwaben	VI	8th
2002–03	Bezirksoberliga Schwaben	VI	6th
2003–04	Bezirksoberliga Schwaben	VI	5th
2004–05	Bezirksoberliga Schwaben	VI	8th
2005–06	Bezirksoberliga Schwaben	VI	3rd
2006–07	Bezirksoberliga Schwaben	VI	1st ↑
2007–08	Landesliga Bayern-Süd	V	10th
2008–09	Landesliga Bayern-Süd	VI	6th
2009–10	Landesliga Bayern-Süd	VI	16th ↓
2010–11	Bezirksoberliga Schwaben	VII	3rd ↑
2011–12	Landesliga Bayern-Süd	VI	5th ↑
2012–13	Bayernliga Süd	V	8th
2013–14	Bayernliga Süd	V	12th
2014–15	Bayernliga Süd	V	11th
2015–16	Bayernliga Süd	V	4th
2016–17	Bayernliga Süd	V	

- With the introduction of the Bezirksoberligas in 1988 as the new fifth tier, below the Landesligas, all leagues below dropped one tier. With the introduction of the Regionalligas in 1994 and the 3. Liga in 2008 as the new third tier, below the 2. Bundesliga, all leagues below dropped one tier. With the establishment of the Regionalliga Bayern as the new fourth tier in Bavaria in 2012 the Bayernliga was split into a northern and a southern division, the number of Landesligas expanded from three to five and the Bezirksoberligas abolished. All leagues from the Bezirksligas onward were elevated one tier.

↑ Promoted	↓ Relegated
