= BSK Olympia Neugablonz =

German football club

- Founded: 21 October 1950
- Ground: Waldstadion
- League: Bezirksliga Schwaben-Süd (VII)
- 2015–16: 3rd
Home colours	Away colours

The BSK Olympia Neugablonz is a German association football club from the Neugablonz suburb of the city of Kaufbeuren, Bavaria.

The suburb of Neugablonz in Kaufbeuren was formed after the Second World War, when refugees from the former German speaking territories in the Czech Republic, mainly from the region around the city of Gablonz, now Jablonec nad Nisou, settled there. While the name Neugablonz quickly became the common name for the suburb, it was not until August 1952, that it was officially recognised, almost two years after the football club BSK Neugablonz was formed by the former residents of Gablonz.

During the Second World War, the area that was to become Neugablonz was an ammunition factory operated by the Dynamit-Aktiengesellschaft. The factory was notorious for its inhuman treatment of the forced labour employed there.

== History ==
=== Origins ===
Coat of arms of Gablonz.

The club was formed on 21 October 1950 under the name of BSK Neugablonz and took up play in the local C-Klasse the lowest possible level, in 1951. Formed by refugees from the city of Gablonz, it saw its roots in the ethnic German sport clubs of that city. The club's current crest still bears a lot of similarity with the coat of arms of modern-day Jablonec nad Nisou, specifically the apple tree. A club under the name of BSK Gablonz had last played in the Gauliga Sudetenland in 1938–39. The crest of this old BSK Gablonz is almost identical to the crest of the new club. In 1939, BSK merged with two other local sides to form NSTG Gablonz, a club controlled by the Nazis, NTSG standing for Nationalsozialistische Turngemeinde.

=== BSK Neugablonz ===
The new BSK quickly rose through the ranks of local football, rising through the B-Klasse to the A-Klasse. The clubs first great success came in 1964, when it won its first Schwaben Cup, beating TSV Gersthofen 5–2. The year after, it won the Bezirksliga Schwaben and earned promotion to the tier-four Landesliga Bayern-Süd. It also made another appearance in the Schwaben Cup final, losing to BC Augsburg.

In the Landesliga, the team finished eighth in 1965–66, followed by a sixth place the season after. It took out the Cup once more in 1966.

The 1967–68 season saw the team compete against newly promoted local rival SpVgg Kaufbeuren in the Landesliga. SpVgg won the league and earned promotion to the Bayernliga while BSK finished fourth. After a fifth place in 1969, the team had a terrible 1969–70 season, finishing second-last with an eight-point gap to a non-relegation rank, and had to return to the Bezirksliga.

=== BSK Olympia Neugablonz ===
In the Bezirksliga, now divided into a northern and a southern group, with BSK playing in the later, the club started under a new name, BSK Olympia Neugablonz, after a merger with local side TSV Olympia Kaufbeuren. It spent four seasons at this level, earning another cup win in 1973 and winning the league in 1974.

Upon return to the Landesliga, the team established itself as an upper-table side, finishing seventh and fourth in its first two seasons there. In 1976–77, rival SpVgg Kaufbeuren returned to the league from the Bayernliga and BSK Olympia managed only an eleventh place, troubled by relegation worries. The season after, the club improved by a place but finished ahead of SpVgg. The 1978–79 season became the club's best ever. Winning the Schwaben Cup for a fourth time, defeating SV Salamander Türkheim in the final, and qualifying for the first round of the German Cup by doing so, it came third in the Landesliga, only two points short of the two teams ahead of it. It played Eintracht Frankfurt in the first round of the German Cup in August 1979, losing 6–1.

The team slipped to eighth place in the following season and finished last in the league in 1981, making a permanent departure from the Landesliga. The club had to sell its stadium to the city of Kaufbeuren for financial reasons in the 1980s.

BSK Olympia declined from then on, at first playing in the Bezirksliga Schwaben-Süd again, then dropping to the A-Klasse Schwaben-Süd and finally, in 1994, to the B-Klasse Ostallgäu. It moved between the B-Klasse and the A-Klasse in the following years, the later being renamed Kreisliga Schwaben-Süd in 1998, The club finished runners-up in this league in 2002, the best result in over a decade.

In 2006, the club finally won the Kreisliga and made a return to the Bezirksliga, where it finished a respectable fifth in its first year back. It however suffered another relegation in the following season, back to the Kreisliga, which had become the ninth tier of the German football league system because of the introduction of the 3. Liga.

In 2009, the club returned to the Bezirksliga on the strength of a title in the Kreisliga Schwaben-Mitte (IX).

In 2009, a friendly was planned between the BSK and FK Baumit Jablonec in an attempt to improve contacts between Neugablonz and Jablonec nad Nisou.

== Honours ==
The club's honours:

=== League ===
- Bezirksliga Schwaben (V)
  - Champions: 1964
- Bezirksliga Schwaben-Süd (V)
  - Champions: 1974
- Kreisliga Schwaben-Süd (VIII)
  - Champions: 2006
- Kreisliga Schwaben-Mitte (IX)
  - Champions: 2009
- B-Klasse Ostallgäu (IX)
  - Champions: 1995

=== Cup ===
- Schwaben Cup
  - Winners: (4) 1964, 1966, 1973, 1979
  - Runners-up: 1965

== Recent seasons ==
The recent season-by-season performance of the club:

Season	Division	Tier	Position
1999–2000	Kreisklasse Ostallgäu	IX	4th
2000–01	Kreisklasse Ostallgäu	IX	2nd
2001–02	Kreisliga Schwaben-Süd	VIII	2nd
2002–03	Kreisliga Schwaben-Süd	VIII	11th
2003–04	Kreisliga Schwaben-Süd	VIII	14th ↓
2004–05	Kreisklasse Ostallgäu	IX	1st ↑
2005–06	Kreisliga Schwaben-Süd	VIII	1st ↑
2006–07	Bezirksliga Schwaben-Süd	VII	5th
2007–08	Bezirksliga Schwaben-Süd	VII	14th ↓
2008–09	Kreisliga Schwaben-Mitte	IX	1st ↑
2009–10	Bezirksliga Schwaben-Süd	VIII	9th
2010–11	Bezirksliga Schwaben-Süd	VIII	9th
2011–12	Bezirksliga Schwaben-Süd	VIII	13th
2012–13	Bezirksliga Schwaben-Süd	VII	12th
2013–14	Bezirksliga Schwaben-Süd	VII	9th
2014–15	Bezirksliga Schwaben-Süd	VII	7th
2015–16	Bezirksliga Schwaben-Süd	VII	3rd
2016–17	Bezirksliga Schwaben-Süd	VII	

- With the introduction of the Bezirksoberligas in 1988 as the new fifth tier, below the Landesligas, all leagues below dropped one tier. With the introduction of the Regionalligas in 1994 and the 3. Liga in 2008 as the new third tier, below the 2. Bundesliga, all leagues below dropped one tier. With the establishment of the Regionalliga Bayern as the new fourth tier in Bavaria in 2012 the Bayernliga was split into a northern and a southern division, the number of Landesligas expanded from three to five and the Bezirksoberligas abolished. All leagues from the Bezirksligas onwards were elevated one tier.

↑ Promoted	↓ Relegated

== DFB-Pokal appearances ==
The club qualified for the first round of the German Cup only once:

Season	Round	Date	Home	Away	Result	Attendance
DFB-Pokal 1979–80	First round	25 August 1979	Eintracht Frankfurt	BSK Olympia Neugablonz	6–1	3,000

Source:"DFB-Pokal" (in German). Weltfussball.de.
