= 1979–80 DFB-Pokal =

Tournament details
- Country: West Germany
- Teams: 128

Final positions
- Champions: Fortuna Düsseldorf
- Runners-up: 1. FC Köln

Tournament statistics
- Matches played: 133
- Top goal scorer(s): Klaus Allofs; Manfred Burgsmüller (9 goals)

The 1979–80 DFB-Pokal was the 37th season of the annual German football cup competition. It began on 24 August 1979 and ended on 4 June 1980. 128 teams competed in the tournament of seven rounds. In the final Fortuna Düsseldorf defeated 1. FC Köln 2–1 to defend their title from the preceding season.

== Matches ==
=== First round ===
24 August 1979
1. FC Kaiserslautern	2 – 0	MSV Duisburg
Karlsruher SC	5 – 1	SC Freiburg
25 August 1979
Alemannia Aachen	0 – 1	SV Werder Bremen
Eintracht Braunschweig	1 – 0	Preußen Münster
Heidenheimer SB	0 – 4	Hertha BSC
Hamburger SV	6 – 0	FC 1908 Villingen
Eintracht Frankfurt	6 – 1	BSK Neugablonz
Borussia Mönchengladbach	2 – 1	FV Biberach
Borussia Dortmund	7 – 0	Bremer SV
1. FC Köln	5 – 1	1. FSV Mainz 05
Borussia Neunkirchen	0 – 4	Fortuna Düsseldorf
TSV 1860 München	5 – 0	FC St. Pauli
TSV Buxtehude	0 – 6	Bayer Uerdingen
FV Weingarten	2 – 7	VfL Bochum
MTV Gifhorn	1 – 4	Bayer 04 Leverkusen
VfL Wolfsburg	0 – 3	VfB Stuttgart
Sportfreunde Eisbachtal	0 – 1	FC Schalke 04
FC Östringen	1 – 10	FC Bayern Munich
Freiburger FC	2 – 1	1. FC Saarbrücken
SpVgg Fürth	3 – 1	BSV Weißenthurm
Eintracht Trier	4 – 2	Wuppertaler SV II
SpVgg Bayreuth	5 – 0	SpVgg Preußen 07 Hameln
Arminia Bielefeld	1 – 0	BFC Preußen Berlin
Rot-Weiß Essen	2 – 1	1. FC Köln II
1. FC Nürnberg	3 – 0	Eintracht Braunschweig II
FC Vilshofen	2 – 3	FV Würzburg 04	(AET)
VfB 1900 Gießen	2 – 4	FC 08 Homburg
Stuttgarter Kickers	3 – 0	TSV Ofterdingen
SC Geislingen	2 – 4	DSC Wanne-Eickel
SG Union Solingen	3 – 1	VfR Aalen
SV Heng	0 – 4	Fortuna Köln
Westfalia Weitmar	1 – 2	SV Darmstadt 98
TuS Chlodwig Zülpich	2 – 6	ESV Ingolstadt
SV Waldhof Mannheim	5 – 1	TBV Lemgo
FC Hanau 93	2 – 2	Wacker 04 Berlin	(AET)
FC Augsburg	7 – 0	FC Wipfeld
TSV Ampfing	1 – 2	Bramfelder SV	(AET)
FT Geestemünde	4 – 1	SV Zeitlarn
TSV Battenberg	5 – 4	SV Auersmacher	(AET)
TuS Schloß Neuhaus	3 – 2	1. FC Nürnberg II
BV 08 Lüttringhausen	3 – 2	SpVgg Erkenschwick
VfB Gaggenau	2 – 2	SpVgg 1928 Au/Iller	(AET)
SV Göppingen	3 – 1	TuS Neuendorf
SG Ohetal	0 – 2	KSV Baunatal
Reinickendorfer Füchse	4 – 2	VfB Lübeck
SV Elversberg	5 – 2	Heider SV 1925	(AET)
TuS 08 Langerwehe	4 – 2	SV Rot-Weiß Hasborn
26 August 1979
Kickers Offenbach	3 – 1	Hannover 96
Wuppertaler SV	1 – 4	VfR Wormatia Worms
Holstein Kiel	3 – 2	OSV Hannover
Viktoria Köln	1 – 0	Tennis Borussia Berlin
SG Wattenscheid 09	2 – 1	MTV 1881 Ingolstadt
VfL Osnabrück	3 – 2	Rot-Weiß Lüdenscheid	(AET)
FSV Frankfurt	2 – 0	Viktoria Aschaffenburg
TuS Xanten	2 – 1	Arminia Hannover
1. FC Kaiserslautern II	3 – 1	SV Meppen
Altonaer FC 93	1 – 0	Viktoria Sindelfingen
Westfalia Herne	4 – 0	SG Hagen-Vorhalle
Union Neumünster	0 – 2	Sportfreunde / DJK Freiburg
Bonner SC	4 – 0	Salamander Türkheim
VfB Oldenburg	1 – 2	SC Verl
1. FC Bocholt	8 – 0	SV Speicher
VfL Frohnlach	8 – 4	Alemannia Haibach	(AET)
1. FC Pforzheim	10 – 2	Phönix Düdelsheim

==== Replays ====
5 September 1979
Wacker 04 Berlin	4 – 1	FC Hanau 93
SpVgg 1928 Au/Iller	5 – 0	VfB Gaggenau

=== Second round ===
28 September 1979
Borussia Mönchengladbach	4 – 0	Rot-Weiß Essen
1. FC Nürnberg	5 – 2	Bayer 04 Leverkusen
VfB Stuttgart	10 – 2	SG Wattenscheid 09
FC Augsburg	1 – 1	Karlsruher SC	(AET)
29 September 1979
SV Werder Bremen	0 – 2	Hertha BSC
FSV Frankfurt	1 – 3	Borussia Dortmund	(AET)
Eintracht Braunschweig	3 – 1	Holstein Kiel
Viktoria Köln	1 – 3	FC Bayern Munich
SV Darmstadt 98	4 – 0	1. FC Kaiserslautern
Freiburger FC	1 – 4	Eintracht Frankfurt
VfR Wormatia Worms	0 – 3	Hamburger SV
VfL Bochum	2 – 1	SpVgg Fürth
TSV 1860 München	6 – 1	1. FC Pforzheim
Bayer Uerdingen	5 – 0	Reinickendorfer Füchse
FC Schalke 04	3 – 0	KSV Baunatal
Fortuna Düsseldorf	2 – 0	Wacker 04 Berlin
DSC Wanne-Eickel	3 – 5	Kickers Offenbach
FC 08 Homburg	5 – 0	FV Würzburg 04
SpVgg Bayreuth	6 – 0	SpVgg 1928 Au/Iller
Stuttgarter Kickers	9 – 0	VfL Frohnlach
Eintracht Trier	0 – 2	TuS 08 Langerwehe
TuS Schloß Neuhaus	1 – 2	Fortuna Köln	(AET)
TSV Battenberg	2 – 0	Bramfelder SV	(AET)
SC Verl	3 – 1	SV Elversberg
SV Göppingen	3 – 1	FT Geestemünde
30 September 1979
1. FC Köln	10 – 0	Altonaer FC 93
SG Union Solingen	3 – 0	ESV Ingolstadt
SV Waldhof Mannheim	7 – 2	Sportfreunde / DJK Freiburg
TuS Xanten	1 – 8	Arminia Bielefeld
1. FC Bocholt	1 – 1	VfL Osnabrück	(AET)
1. FC Kaiserslautern II	2 – 3	Bonner SC	(AET)
Westfalia Herne	1 – 4	BV 08 Lüttringhausen

==== Replays ====
10 October 1979
VfL Osnabrück	3 – 2	1. FC Bocholt
12 October 1979
Karlsruher SC	3 – 0	FC Augsburg

=== Third round ===
5 January 1980
Eintracht Frankfurt	2 – 0	SV Waldhof Mannheim
12 January 1980
Eintracht Braunschweig	2 – 3	VfB Stuttgart	(AET)
VfL Bochum	3 – 3	1. FC Köln	(AET)
Borussia Dortmund	3 – 1	Arminia Bielefeld	(AET)
SpVgg Bayreuth	1 – 0	FC Bayern Munich
Karlsruher SC	1 – 0	Borussia Mönchengladbach	(AET)
Bayer Uerdingen	2 – 0	SG Union Solingen
Kickers Offenbach	2 – 0	Hamburger SV
SV Göppingen	1 – 4	Fortuna Düsseldorf
Hertha BSC	0 – 0	TuS 08 Langerwehe	(AET)
TSV 1860 München	3 – 0	BV 08 Lüttringhausen
FC Schalke 04	3 – 1	Bonner SC
1. FC Nürnberg	1 – 2	FC 08 Homburg
SV Darmstadt 98	7 – 2	Fortuna Köln
SC Verl	1 – 7	Stuttgarter Kickers
VfL Osnabrück	4 – 0	TSV Battenberg

==== Replays ====
29 January 1980
TuS 08 Langerwehe	2 – 1	Hertha BSC
30 January 1980
1. FC Köln	2 – 1	VfL Bochum

=== Round of 16 ===
13 February 1980
1. FC Köln	3 – 1	SV Darmstadt 98
15 February 1980
FC Schalke 04	2 – 0	VfL Osnabrück
16 February 1980
Karlsruher SC	3 – 5	Fortuna Düsseldorf
VfB Stuttgart	3 – 2	Eintracht Frankfurt
Borussia Dortmund	2 – 1	Bayer Uerdingen
FC 08 Homburg	1 – 0	TSV 1860 München
SpVgg Bayreuth	5 – 2	TuS 08 Langerwehe	(AET)
17 February 1980
Stuttgarter Kickers	2 – 5	Kickers Offenbach

=== Quarter-finals ===
6 April 1980
Borussia Dortmund	3 – 1	VfB Stuttgart
FC 08 Homburg	1 – 4	1. FC Köln
FC Schalke 04	3 – 1	SpVgg Bayreuth
Kickers Offenbach	2 – 5	Fortuna Düsseldorf	(AET)

=== Semi-finals ===
10 May 1980
FC Schalke 04	0 – 2	1. FC Köln
Fortuna Düsseldorf	3 – 1	Borussia Dortmund

=== Final ===
4 June 1980
19:30 CEST

Fortuna Düsseldorf	2–1	1. FC Köln
Wenzel 60'; T. Allofs 65'	Report	Cullmann 26'

Parkstadion, Gelsenkirchen
Attendance: 65,000
Referee: Heinz Aldinger (Waiblingen)
