= SpVgg Kaufbeuren =

German football club

- Full name: Spielvereiniging Kaufbeuren e.V.
- Founded: 1909
- Chairman: Thomas Neumann
- Manager: Fred Jentzsch
- League: Landesliga Bayern-Südwest (VI)
- 2015–16: 12th
Home colours	Away colours

SpVgg Kaufbeuren is a German association football club from the town of Kaufbeuren, Bavaria. The roots of the association are in the establishment on 8 August 1858 of the gymnastics club and community fire brigade Turnfeuerwehr Kaufbeuren.

== History ==
They later became simply a gymnastics club known as Turnverein Kaufbeuren and in 1909 a football department was established. This department became independent as Spielvereinigung Kaufbeuren in 1920. The footballers have played quietly as a local side for most of their existence. In 1939 they took part in a promotion playoff for the Gauliga Bayern, one of sixteen top-flight divisions created in the 1933 re-organization of German football under the Third Reich. The attempt to advance failed as they went down 1–11 and 1–7 to TSV Schwaben Augsburg. The team also made an appearance in 1941 in the preliminary round of play for the Tschammer-Pokal, predecessor of today's DFB-Pokal (German Cup), that ended in a 0–4 defeat to Bayern Munich.

From 1959 until the 1963 formation of the Bundesliga, SpVgg played in the third division Amateurliga Südbayern where their best result was a second-place finish in 1958–59. Through the 60s and 70s the team moved frequently between the Landesliga Bayern-Süd (IV) and the Amateurliga Bayern (III) capturing Landesliga titles in 1965, 1968, and 1974. Kaufbeuren's performances fell off through the early 80s, being relegated from the Landesliga in 1986 and only making brief returns to this league in the 1994–95 and 1998–99 seasons. The side, for the most part, played in the Bezirksoberliga Schwaben (VI), where it spent a record 22 out of 24 possible seasons from the leagues interception in 1988 to its disbanding in 2012.

At the end of the 2011–12 season the club qualified directly for the newly expanded Landesliga after finishing fifth in the Bezirksoberliga.

== Local rivals & competition ==
The traditional local rival for the SpVgg is FC Kempten due to the closeness of the two towns. Within Kaufbeuren this role has been taken up by BSK Olympia Neugablonz, a suburban club formed after World War II by German refugees from the city of Gablonz (now Jablonec nad Nisou, Czech Republic). The two teams have not played in the same league since the early 1980s.

In the town of Kaufbeuren, like many other small southern Bavarian towns, football has never been the dominant sport. The local ice hockey club, ESV Kaufbeuren, currently playing in the DEL2 (II), is much more popular and successful, having produced a number of German international players and previously been part of the first division DEL (Deutsche Eishockey Liga or German Ice Hockey League). Against this, the SpVgg has a difficult time in attracting support and sponsorships.

== Honours ==
The club's honours:

=== League ===
- Amateurliga Bayern-South
  - Runners-up: 1959
- 2. Amateurliga Schwaben (IV)
  - Champions: (2) 1954, 1958
- Landesliga Bayern-Süd (IV)
  - Champions: (3) 1965, 1968, 1974
  - Runners-up: 1964
- Bezirksoberliga Schwaben (VI)
  - Champions: (2) 1994, 1998

=== Cup ===
- Schwaben Cup
  - Winners: (3) 1952, 1960, 1961
  - Runners-up: 1959

== Recent seasons ==
The recent season-by-season performance of the club:

Season	Division	Tier	Position
1988–89	Bezirksoberliga Schwaben	V	7th
1989–90	Bezirksoberliga Schwaben	V	8th
1990–91	Bezirksoberliga Schwaben	V	6th
1991–92	Bezirksoberliga Schwaben	V	6th
1992–93	Bezirksoberliga Schwaben	V	4th
1993–94	Bezirksoberliga Schwaben	V	1st ↑
1994–95	Landesliga Bayern-Süd	V	15th ↓
1995–96	Bezirksoberliga Schwaben	VI	7th
1996–97	Bezirksoberliga Schwaben	VI	4th
1997–98	Bezirksoberliga Schwaben	VI	1st ↑
1998–99	Landesliga Bayern-Süd	V	17th ↓
1999–2000	Bezirksoberliga Schwaben	VI	5th
2000–01	Bezirksoberliga Schwaben	VI	3rd
2001–02	Bezirksoberliga Schwaben	VI	10th
2002–03	Bezirksoberliga Schwaben	VI	7th

Season	Division	Tier	Position
2003–04	Bezirksoberliga Schwaben	VI	7th
2004–05	Bezirksoberliga Schwaben	VI	10th
2005–06	Bezirksoberliga Schwaben	VI	9th
2006–07	Bezirksoberliga Schwaben	VI	7th
2007–08	Bezirksoberliga Schwaben	VI	7th
2008–09	Bezirksoberliga Schwaben	VII	9th
2009–10	Bezirksoberliga Schwaben	VII	6th
2010–11	Bezirksoberliga Schwaben	VII	9th
2011–12	Bezirksoberliga Schwaben	VII	5th ↑
2012–13	Landesliga Bayern-Südwest	VI	13th
2013–14	Landesliga Bayern-Südwest	VI	11th
2014–15	Landesliga Bayern-Südwest	VI	8th
2015–16	Landesliga Bayern-Südwest	VI	12th
2016–17	Landesliga Bayern-Südwest	VI	
2017–18			

- With the introduction of the Bezirksoberligas in 1988 as the new fifth tier, below the Landesligas, all leagues below dropped one tier. With the introduction of the Regionalligas in 1994 and the 3. Liga in 2008 as the new third tier, below the 2. Bundesliga, all leagues below dropped one tier. With the establishment of the Regionalliga Bayern as the new fourth tier in Bavaria in 2012 the Bayernliga was split into a northern and a southern division, the number of Landesligas expanded from three to five and the Bezirksoberligas abolished. All leagues from the Bezirksligas onwards were elevated one tier.

↑ Promoted	↓ Relegated
