= SpVgg Au/Iller =

German football club

- Full name: Sportvereinigung Au/Iller 1928 e. V.
- Nickname: Die Au'mer
- Founded: 1928
- Ground: Heinrich-Oßwald-Stadion
- Capacity: 1,000
- Chairman: Gordon Kniesche
- Manager: Silvio Mikic
- League: Kreisliga Donau/Iller A 3 (IX)
- 2015–16: 11th
Home colours	Away colours

SpVgg Au/Iller is a German football club from the district of Au in the northwest quarter of Illertissen, Bavaria. The team was founded 27 October 1928 as Sportvereinigung Au when Au was still a separate village on the banks of the river Iller.

== History ==
Long an unremarked local side, in 1995 Au won its way out of sixth-tier play into the Verbandsliga Württemberg (V), where they finished as vice-champions in 1997 before winning the division title in 1999. That advanced them to the Oberliga Baden-Württemberg (IV) for a five-year turn running from 1999 to 2004. They also have a 1980 DFB-Pokal (German Cup) appearance and a losing appearance in the 1997 Württemberg-Pokal (Württemberg Cup) final to their credit.

Despite being a Bavarian club, SpVgg plays in the competition of neighbouring Württemberg because the town is closer to others there than in its home state. Their promotion to the Oberliga Baden-Württemberg in 1999 made them the first Bavarian club to ever play in Baden-Württemberg's top league.

Due to the expansion of the number of clubs in the leagues above, a second-place finish in the Verbandsliga in 2007–08 qualified the club to directly return to the Oberliga for the next season, alongside local rival FV Illertissen. Au was relegated from the league again in 2008–09 and experienced a disastrous 2009–10 campaign in the Verbandsliga, finishing last with only one point to their name, suffering point deductions and conceding 112 goals in 30 games. After no improvement at the level below in 2010–11, the club withdrew its team altogether from the league, thereby suffering another relegation and a restart in the Kreisliga A 3.

In addition to fielding a football team the sports club has departments for basketball, gymnastics, table tennis and tennis.

== Honours ==
The club's honours:

=== League ===
- Verbandsliga Württemberg (V)
  - Champions: 1999
- Landesliga Württemberg 2 (V-VI)
  - Champions: 1989, 1993, 1995

== Recent seasons ==
The recent season-by-season performance of the club:

Year	Division	Tier	Position
1978–79	Verbandsliga Württemberg	IV	8th
1979–80	Verbandsliga Württemberg	IV	9th
1980–81	Verbandsliga Württemberg	IV	2nd
1981–82	Verbandsliga Württemberg	IV	12th
1982–83	Verbandsliga Württemberg	IV	16th ↓
1983–84	Landesliga Württemberg 2	V	6th
1984–85	Landesliga Württemberg 2	V	2nd
1985–86	Landesliga Württemberg 2	V	2nd
1986–87	Landesliga Württemberg 2	V	10th
1987–88	Landesliga Württemberg 2	V	2nd
1988–89	Landesliga Württemberg 2	V	1st ↑
1989–90	Verbandsliga Württemberg	IV	16th ↓
1990–91	Landesliga Württemberg 2	V	2nd
1991–92	Landesliga Württemberg 2	V	2nd
1992–93	Landesliga Württemberg 2	V	1st ↑
1993–94	Verbandsliga Württemberg	IV	15th ↓
1994–95	Landesliga Württemberg 2	VI	1st ↑
1995–96	Verbandsliga Württemberg	V	2nd
1996–97	Verbandsliga Württemberg	V	4th
1997–98	Verbandsliga Württemberg	V	3rd

Year	Division	Tier	Position
1998–99	Verbandsliga Württemberg	V	1st ↑
1999–2000	Oberliga Baden-Württemberg	IV	5th
2000–01	Oberliga Baden-Württemberg	IV	9th
2001–02	Oberliga Baden-Württemberg	IV	4th
2002–03	Oberliga Baden-Württemberg	IV	13th
2003–04	Oberliga Baden-Württemberg	IV	17th ↓
2004–05	Verbandsliga Württemberg	V	8th
2005–06	Verbandsliga Württemberg	V	10th
2006–07	Verbandsliga Württemberg	V	4th
2007–08	Verbandsliga Württemberg	V	2nd ↑
2008–09	Oberliga Baden-Württemberg	V	17th ↓
2009–10	Verbandsliga Württemberg	VI	16th ↓
2010–11	Landesliga Württemberg 2	VII	16th ↓
2011–12	Kreisliga Donau/Iller A 3	IX	15th
2012–13	Kreisliga Donau/Iller A 3	IX	7th
2013–14	Kreisliga Donau/Iller A 3	IX	11th
2014–15	Kreisliga Donau/Iller A 3	IX	4th
2015–16	Kreisliga Donau/Iller A 3	IX	11th
2016–17	Kreisliga Donau/Iller A 3	IX	
2017–18			

With the introduction of the Regionalligas in 1994 and the 3. Liga in 2008 as the new third tier, below the 2. Bundesliga, all leagues below dropped one tier.

↑ Promoted	↓ Relegated

== Stadium ==
Since 1978 SpVgg Au/Iller have played their home matches in the Heinrich-Oßwald-Stadion, which has a capacity of 1,000.

== DFB Cup appearances ==
The club has qualified for the first round of the German Cup only once:

Season	Round	Date	Home	Away	Result	Attendance
DFB Cup 1979-80	First round	25 August 1979	VfB Gaggenau	SpVgg Au/Iller	2–2 aet	
DFB Cup 1979-80	First round replay	5 September 1979	SpVgg Au/Iller	VfB Gaggenau	5–0	
DFB Cup 1979-80	Second round	29 September 1979	SpVgg Bayreuth	SpVgg Au/Iller	6–0	
