= FC Kempten =

German football club

- Full name: Fußball-Club Kempten im Allgäu e. V.
- Nickname(s): FCK
- Founded: 1907
- Ground: Illerstadion
- Capacity: 9,000
- Chairman: Stefan Zeiler
- Manager: Matthias Jörg
- League: Landesliga Bayern-Südwest (VI)
- 2017–18: Bezirksliga Schwaben-Süd (VII), 1st ↑
Home colours	Away colours

FC Kempten is German association football club based in Kempten, Bavaria.

== History ==
The team was established in 1903 as the football department of gymnastics club Männerturnvereins Kempten. In 1907 the parent association merged with two other local gymnastics clubs to form Turnverein 1856 Kempten and on 21 September 1908 the footballers went their own way as an independent side known as Fußball Club Kempten. The footballers briefly re-joined TV in 1923, but resumed their independence two years later.

Following World War II FC Kempten played in the Amateurliga Bayern-Süd (III) between 1957 and 1963 where they earned mid-table results. As a result of league restructuring in 1963 they slipped to fourth-tier play in the Landesliga Bayern-Süd. Over the next several decades Kempten played as an unremarked side in fourth- and fifth-tier competition. In 1999 the club emerged as the champions of the Landesliga Süd (V) and won promotion to the Bayernliga (IV) for a two season long turn. They won their way back to the Bayernliga in 2005, finishing second in the Landesliga, and were immediately relegated, but have returned for the 2007–08 campaign, when a last place finish in the Bayernliga meant relegation once more. In 2008–09, the club declined further, suffering relegation to the Bezirksoberliga, followed by relegation to the Bezirksliga in 2010. The team dropped to a new low for the 2011–12 season with its relegation to the Kreisliga Schwaben-Süd after a loss in the relegation play-off. They had to stay at this level for only one season before a Kreisliga championship took it back up a level, back to the Bezirksliga, from where it was relegated again straight away. It took out another Kreisliga championship in 2015 and returned to the Bezirksliga but was yet again relegated after just one season.

FC Kempten plays its home matches in the Illerstadion, opened on 15 August 1963. After renovations in 2000 the facility has a capacity of 9,000 spectators (720 seats).

== Rivals ==
The TSV Kottern is FC Kempten's biggest local rival, being also based in the town of Kempten. They last faced each other in the Landesliga Bayern-Süd in the 2006–07 season, when both games ended in draws, 1–1 and 2–2. In the Schwaben Cup however, Kottern gained the upper hand, defeating the FC 6–5 on penalties after a 2–2 draw after normal time.

== Honours ==
The club's honours:

=== League ===
- 2nd Amateurliga Schwaben (IV)
  - Champions: (5) 1949, 1951, 1952, 1956, 1957
- Landesliga Bayern-Süd (V)
  - Champions: (2) 1999, 2007
  - Runners-up: 2005
- Bezirksoberliga Schwaben
  - Runners-up: (2) 1994, 1997
- Bezirksliga Schwaben-Süd
  - Champions: (4) 1970, 1982, 1987, 2018
- Kreisliga Schwaben-Süd
  - Champions: 2013, 2015
  - Runners-up: 2011, 2017

=== Cup ===
- Schwaben Cup
  - Winners: (3) 1963, 1985, 1987
  - Runners-up: (2) 1962, 1995

=== Indoor ===
- Schwaben indoor championship
  - Winners: (2) 2000, 2005

== Recent seasons ==
The recent season-by-season performance of the club:

Season	Division	Tier	Position
1986–87	Bezirksliga Schwaben-Süd	V	1st ↑
1987–88	Landesliga Bayern-Süd	IV	14th ↓
1988–89	Bezirksoberliga Schwaben	V	11th
1989–90	Bezirksoberliga Schwaben	V	11th
1990–91	Bezirksoberliga Schwaben	V	3rd
1991–92	Bezirksoberliga Schwaben	V	9th
1992–93	Bezirksoberliga Schwaben	V	6th
1993–94	Bezirksoberliga Schwaben	V	2nd ↑
1994–95	Landesliga Bayern-Süd	V	7th
1995–96	Landesliga Bayern-Süd	V	15th ↓
1996–97	Bezirksoberliga Schwaben	VI	2nd ↑
1997–98	Landesliga Bayern-Süd	V	8th
1998–99	Landesliga Bayern-Süd	V	1st ↑
1999–2000	Bayernliga	IV	15th
2000–01	Bayernliga	IV	16th ↓
2001–02	Landesliga Bayern-Süd	V	4th
2002–03	Landesliga Bayern-Süd	V	4th

Season	Division	Tier	Position
2003–04	Landesliga Bayern-Süd	V	8th
2004–05	Landesliga Bayern-Süd	V	2nd ↑
2005–06	Bayernliga	IV	16th ↓
2006–07	Landesliga Bayern-Süd	V	1st ↑
2007–08	Bayernliga	IV	18th ↓
2008–09	Landesliga Bayern-Süd	VI	17th ↓
2009–10	Bezirksoberliga Schwaben	VII	14th ↓
2010–11	Bezirksliga Schwaben-Süd	VIII	13th ↓
2011–12	Kreisliga Schwaben-Süd	IX	2nd
2013–14	Kreisliga Schwaben-Süd	VIII	1st ↑
2013–14	Bezirksliga Schwaben-Süd	VII	15th ↓
2014–15	Kreisliga Schwaben-Süd	VIII	1st ↑
2015–16	Bezirksliga Schwaben-Süd	VII	13th ↓
2016–17	Kreisliga Schwaben-Süd	VIII	2nd ↑
2017–18	Bezirksliga Schwaben-Süd	VII	1st ↑
2018–19	Landesliga Bayern-Südwest	VI	

- With the introduction of the Bezirksoberligas in 1988 as the new fifth tier, below the Landesligas, all leagues below dropped one tier. With the introduction of the Regionalligas in 1994 and the 3. Liga in 2008 as the new third tier, below the 2. Bundesliga, all leagues below dropped one tier. With the establishment of the Regionalliga Bayern as the new fourth tier in Bavaria in 2012 the Bayernliga was split into a northern and a southern division, the number of Landesligas expanded from three to five and the Bezirksoberligas abolished. All leagues from the Bezirksligas onwards were elevated one tier.

↑ Promoted	↓ Relegated
