= Kreisliga Schwaben-Süd =

- Country: Germany
- State: Bavaria
- Number of clubs: 13
- Level on pyramid: Level 8
- Promotion to: Bezirksliga Süd
- Relegation to: Kreisklasse Allgäu III; Kreisklasse Allgäu IV
- Current champions: FC Oberstdorf (2019–21)

The Kreisliga Schwaben-Süd is currently the eighth tier of the German football league system in the southern region of the Bavarian Regierungsbezirk of Swabia (German: Schwaben). Until the disbanding of the Bezirksoberliga Schwaben in 2012 it was the ninth tier. From 2008, when the 3. Liga was introduced, was the eighth tier of the league system, until the introduction of the Regionalligas in 1994 the seventh tier.

== Overview ==
The winner of the Kreisliga Schwaben-Süd, like the winner of the Kreisliga Schwaben-Mitte and the Kreisliga Schwaben-Augsburg, is directly promoted to the Bezirksliga Schwaben-Süd. The second placed teams out of those leagues and the 13th placed team out of the Bezirksliga play-off for the last spot there.

The teams relegated from the Kreisliga have to step down to the Kreisklasse. The Kreisliga Schwaben-Süd is fed by the Kreisklasses Schwaben-Allgäu III and Schwaben-Allgäu IV.

Until 1998, the Kreisliga Süd was called A-Klasse Süd. Until 2009, reserve teams of clubs in the league had to enter a parallel reserves division without promotion or relegation but have since been allowed to join the regular league system.

== League champions ==
The league champions since 1993 were:

Season	Club
1992–93	TSV Dietmannsried
1993–94	FC Füssen
1994–95	1. FC Sonthofen
1995–96	TSV Sulzberg
1996–97	TSV Fischen
1997–98	TSV Betzigau
1998–99	TSV Friesenried
1999–2000	FC Füssen
2000–01	VfB Durach
2001–02	TSV Marktoberdorf
2002–03	VfB Durach
2003–04	SSV Wildpoldsried
2004–05	TSV Lengenwang
2005–06	BSK Olympia Neugablonz

Season	Club
2006–07	SV Pforzen
2007–08	1. FC Sonthofen II
2008–09	TSV Lengenwang
2009–10	FC Füssen
2010–11	SSV Wildpoldsried
2011–12	FC Wiggensbach
2012–13	FC Kempten
2013–14	SSV Wildpoldsried
2014–15	FC Kempten
2015–16	TV Bad Grönenbach
2016–17	VfB Durach II
2017–18	FC Thalhofen
2018–19	SV Stöttwang
2019–21	FC Oberstdorf

- In 2017, VfB Durach II was ineligible for promotion. FC Kempten was promoted as runners-up instead.

== Current clubs ==
The clubs in the league in the 2021–22 season and their 2019–21 final positions:

Club	Position
TSV Kottern II	2nd
VfB Durach II	3rd
FC Wiggensbach	4th
TV Weitnau	5th
SC Ronsberg	6th
FC Türkspor Kempten	7th
TSV Betzigau	8th
TSV Pfronten	9th
TV Haldenwang	10th
FC Füssen	11th
TSV Altusried	12th
SG Niedersonth./Martinszell	KK (promoted)
SC Untrasried	KK (promoted)
