= TSV Kottern =

German football club

- Full name: Turn- und Sportverein Kottern-St. Mang 1874 e. V.
- Founded: 1925
- Chairman: Hannes Feneberg
- Manager: Martin Dausch
- League: Bayernliga Süd (V)
- 2025–26: Bayernliga Süd, 14th of 17
Home colours	Away colours

Turn- und Sportverein Kottern-St. Mang 1874 e. V., simply known as TSV Kottern, is a German football club based in Kottern, a district of Kempten, Bavaria.

== History ==
The team was established on 15 September 1925 as Freier Fußballclub Kottern as a worker's sports club. The club was broken up as politically undesirable under the Nazi regime and the membership became part of Turn- und Sportverein Kottern, founded in 1874, as that association's football department. The side played in the senior local level A-Klasse competition throughout the 30s and on into the mid-40s.

Following World War II Kottern played in the Kreisliga Schwaben-Süd where they won a title in 1947 but could not accept promotion due to the bad transport situation in the post war days, making travelling to away games very difficult. They won a second title in 1953 and advanced to the Landesliga Bayern (III), the top-level competition in the state, where they played from 1954 to 1963, with the exception of the 1959–60 season. German football was re-structured with the formation of the Bundesliga in 1963, and TSV was sent down to the Bezirksliga Schwaben-Süd (V), where the club remained in the coming seasons. Kottern found itself relegated to the A-Klasse Süd in 1970 and 1978 but both times returned to the Bezirksliga shortly after.

In October 1971, the club TSV Kottern merged with the TSV St. Mang to form TSV Kottern-St. Mang.

The club became part of the newly formed Bezirksoberliga Schwaben (VI) in 1987, and after slipping briefly in 1990, returned to capture the division in 1993 and win promotion to the Landesliga Bayern-Süd (V) for a three-season turn.

For the 2007–08 season, Kottern was back in the Bezirksoberliga and found itself struggling in the relegation zone. The club terminated its manager, Uwe Zenkner, on 3 December 2007 and hired Bernd Kunze in the hope of improving its situation, the move paying off with a ninth-place finish at the end of season. Another Bezirksoberliga title in 2010 took the club back to the Landesliga.

At the end of the 2011–12 season the club qualified directly for the newly expanded Bayernliga after finishing sixth in the Landesliga. In this league the club lasted for only one season before suffering relegation back to the Landesliga. It won the Landesliga Südwest title in 2014–15 and was promoted back to the Bayernliga.

== Ice hockey department ==
The TSV Kottern also used to operate an ice hockey department from 1950 to April 2007. The club's senior team left the TSV to turn professional and form the EA Kempten in 1983. The TSV however continued to field an amateur side. With the end of professional ice hockey in Kempten in 2004, the TSV once more became the only club in the city. From 2004, the team played in the Landesliga (V) for three seasons, after winning the Bavarian Bezirksliga (VI) championship and gaining promotion. In April 2007, it was decided to form a new, semi-professional side, the ESC Kempten and Kotterns ice hockey department joined the new club, ending almost 60 years of tradition at the TSV.

== Honours ==
The club's honours:

=== League ===
- 2. Amateurliga Schwaben (IV)
  - Champions: (2) 1953, 1960
- Bezirksoberliga Schwaben (V-VI)
  - Champions: (4) 1993, 2002, 2005, 2010
- Bezirksliga Schwaben-Süd (VI)
  - Champions: 1991
- Landesliga Bayern-Südwest
  - Champions: 2015

=== Cup ===
- Schwaben Cup
  - Runners-up: (2) 1954, 1999

== Recent seasons ==
The recent season-by-season performance of the club:

Season	Division	Tier	Position
1988–89	Bezirksoberliga Schwaben	V	13th
1989–90	Bezirksoberliga Schwaben	V	16th ↓
1990–91	Bezirksliga Schwaben-Süd	VI	1st ↑
1991–92	Bezirksoberliga Schwaben	V	5th
1992–93	Bezirksoberliga Schwaben	V	1st ↑
1993–94	Landesliga Bayern-Süd	IV	14th
1994–95	Landesliga Bayern-Süd	V	11th
1995–96	Landesliga Bayern-Süd	V	17th ↓
1996–97	Bezirksoberliga Schwaben	VI	3rd
1997–98	Bezirksoberliga Schwaben	VI	9th
1998–99	Bezirksoberliga Schwaben	VI	11th
1999–2000	Bezirksoberliga Schwaben	VI	10th
2000–01	Bezirksoberliga Schwaben	VI	13th
2001–02	Bezirksoberliga Schwaben	VI	1st ↑
2002–03	Landesliga Bayern-Süd	V	15th ↓

Season	Division	Tier	Position
2003–04	Bezirksoberliga Schwaben	VI	12th
2004–05	Bezirksoberliga Schwaben	VI	1st ↑
2005–06	Landesliga Bayern-Süd	V	11th
2006–07	Landesliga Bayern-Süd	V	17th ↓
2007–08	Bezirksoberliga Schwaben	VI	9th
2008–09	Bezirksoberliga Schwaben	VII	6th
2009–10	Bezirksoberliga Schwaben	VII	1st ↑
2010–11	Landesliga Bayern-Süd	VI	3rd
2011–12	Landesliga Bayern-Süd	VI	6th ↑
2012–13	Bayernliga Süd	V	18th ↓
2013–14	Landesliga Bayern-Südwest	VI	5th
2014–15	Landesliga Bayern-Südwest	VI	1st ↑
2015–16	Bayernliga Süd	V	11th
2016–17	Bayernliga Süd	V	
2017–18			

- With the introduction of the Bezirksoberligas in 1988 as the new fifth tier, below the Landesligas, all leagues below dropped one tier. With the introduction of the Regionalligas in 1994 and the 3. Liga in 2008 as the new third tier, below the 2. Bundesliga, all leagues below dropped one tier. With the establishment of the Regionalliga Bayern as the new fourth tier in Bavaria in 2012 the Bayernliga was split into a northern and a southern division, the number of Landesligas expanded from three to five and the Bezirksoberligas abolished. All leagues from the Bezirksligas onwards were elevated one tier.

↑ Promoted	↓ Relegated
