= TSV Schwabmünchen =

- Full name: Turn- und Sportverein Schwabmünchen 1863 e. V.
- Founded: 1863
- Ground: Ivo-Moll-Stadion
- Capacity: 2,000
- Chairman: Hans Nebauer
- Manager: Guido Kandziora
- League: Bayernliga Süd (V)
- 2025–26: Landesliga Bayern-Südwest, 1st of 18 (promoted)

TSV Schwabmünchen (formally Turn- und Sportverein Schwabmünchen 1863 e. V.) is a German association football club from the town of Schwabmünchen, Bavaria.

The club's greatest success came in 2012 when it qualified for the new southern division of the expanded Bayernliga, the fifth tier of the German football league system.

== History ==
For most of its history the club has been a non-describt amateur side in local Bavarian football. The club first rose above local football in Bavarian Swabia in 1968 when it won the Bezirksliga Schwaben and earned promotion to the tier four Landesliga Bayern-Süd. At this level the Schwabmünchen lasted for two seasons, coming 14th and 18th before being relegated again, now to the Bezirksliga Schwaben-Süd.

The club remained undistinguished after that from 1970 to 1998, when it earned promotion to the Bezirksoberliga Schwaben. After a ninth place in 1999 a third rank in 2000 allowed the side to take part in the promotion round to the Landesliga Süd. Having been successful at that the 2000–01 season in the Landesliga saw TSV Schwabmünchen relegated straight again. The side became a jo-jo team after this, earning promotion back to the Landesliga in 2003, once again lasting for only one season and even being relegated from the Bezirksoberliga in 2005. A league title Bezirksliga in the following year took the club back up to the Bezirksoberliga and, within two seasons, back to the Landesliga. Four years at this level followed, with a third place in 2011–12, the 49th and final season for the Landesliga Süd, as its best result. The later earned the club direct promotion to the new southern division of the Bayernliga, finishing a place above the relegation ranks in its first season there. The club performed much better in its second season there, finishing eighth.

== Honours ==
The club's honours:

=== League ===
- Bezirksoberliga Schwaben
  - Champions: 2008
  - Runners-up: 2003
- Bezirksliga Schwaben
  - Champions: 1968
- Bezirksliga Schwaben-Süd
  - Champions: 2006
- Kreisliga Schwaben-Augsburg
  - Champions: 1994

== Recent managers ==
Recent managers of the club:

| Manager | Start | Finish |
|---|---|---|
| Guido Kandziora | 1 July 2011 | Present |

== Recent seasons ==
The recent season-by-season performance of the club:

| Season | Division | Tier | Position |
|---|---|---|---|
| 1999–2000 | Bezirksoberliga Schwaben | VI | 3rd ↑ |
| 2000–01 | Landesliga Bayern-Süd | V | 15th ↓ |
| 2001–02 | Bezirksoberliga Schwaben | VI | 3rd |
| 2002–03 | Bezirksoberliga Schwaben | VI | 2nd ↑ |
| 2003–04 | Landesliga Bayern-Süd | V | 19th ↓ |
| 2004–05 | Bezirksoberliga Schwaben | VI | 16th ↓ |
| 2005–06 | Bezirksliga Schwaben-Süd | VII | 1st ↑ |
| 2006–07 | Bezirksoberliga Schwaben | VI | 9th |
| 2007–08 | Bezirksoberliga Schwaben | VI | 1st ↑ |
| 2008–09 | Landesliga Bayern-Süd | VI | 7th |
| 2009–10 | Landesliga Bayern-Süd | VI | 11th |
| 2010–11 | Landesliga Bayern-Süd | VI | 13th |
| 2011–12 | Landesliga Bayern-Süd | VI | 3rd ↑ |
| 2012–13 | Bayernliga Süd | V | 14th |
| 2013–14 | Bayernliga Süd | V | 8th |
| 2014–15 | Bayernliga Süd | V | 14th |
| 2015–16 | Bayernliga Süd | V | 14th |
| 2016–17 | Bayernliga Süd | V | |

- With the introduction of the Bezirksoberligas in 1988 as the new fifth tier, below the Landesligas, all leagues below dropped one tier. With the introduction of the Regionalligas in 1994 and the 3. Liga in 2008 as the new third tier, below the 2. Bundesliga, all leagues below dropped one tier. With the establishment of the Regionalliga Bayern as the new fourth tier in Bavaria in 2012 the Bayernliga was split into a northern and a southern division, the number of Landesligas expanded from three to five and the Bezirksoberligas abolished. All leagues from the Bezirksligas onward were elevated one tier.

| ↑ Promoted | ↓ Relegated |
