= Kreisliga Schwaben-Mitte =

- Country: Germany
- State: Bavaria
- Number of clubs: 14
- Level on pyramid: Level 8
- Promotion to: Bezirksliga Süd
- Relegation to: Kreisklasse Allgäu I; Kreisklasse Allgäu II
- Current champions: TSV Mindelheim (2019–21)

The Kreisliga Schwaben-Mitte is currently the eighth tier of the German football league system in the central region of the Bavarian Regierungsbezirk of Swabia (German: Schwaben). Until the disbanding of the Bezirksoberliga Schwaben in 2012 it was the ninth tier. From 2008, when the 3. Liga was introduced, was the eighth tier of the league system, until the introduction of the Regionalligas in 1994 the seventh tier.

== Overview ==
The winner of the Kreisliga Schwaben-Mitte, like the winner of the Kreisliga Schwaben-Süd and the Kreisliga Schwaben-Augsburg, is directly promoted to the Bezirksliga Schwaben-Süd. The second placed teams out of those leagues and the 13th placed team out of the Bezirksliga play-off for the last spot there.

The teams relegated from the Kreisliga have to step down to the Kreisklasse. The Kreisliga Schwaben-Mitte is fed by the Kreisklasses Schwaben-Mindelheim and Schwaben-Memmingen.

Until 1998, the Kreisliga Mitte was called A-Klasse Mitte. Until 2010, reserve teams of clubs in the league had to enter a parallel reserves division without promotion or relegation but have since been allowed to join the regular league system.

== League champions ==
The league champions since 1993 were:

Season	Club
1992–93	FC Viktoria Buxheim
1993–94	ASV Fellheim
1994–95	FC Niederrieden
1995–96	FC Viktoria Buxheim
1996–97	TSV Legau
1997–98	BSC Memmingen
1998–99	FC Buchloe
1999–2000	SV Lachen
2000–01	FC Bad Wörishofen
2001–02	SV Lachen
2002–03	BSC Wolfertsschwenden
2003–04	SV Egg an der Günz
2004–05	TSV Ottobeuren
2005–06	Tur Abdin Memmingen

Season	Club
2006–07	TSV Mindelheim
2007–08	BSC Memmingen
2008–09	BSK Olympia Neugablonz
2009–10	SV Ungerhausen
2010–11	BSC Memmingen
2011–12	FSV Lamerdingen
2012–13	FC Viktoria Buxheim
2013–14	ASV Fellheim
2014–15	DJK-SV Memmingen-Ost
2015–16	TSV Babenhausen
2016–17	FC Heimertingen
2017–18	Viktoria Buxheim
2018–19	TSV Ottobeuren
2019–21	TSV Mindelheim

== Current clubs ==
The clubs in the league in the 2019–21 season and their final positions:

Club	Position
TSV Mindelheim	1st (promoted)
DJK SV Ost Memmingen	2nd
TSV Ottobeuren	3rd
TSV Kammlach	4th
Viktoria Buxheim	5th
SVO Germaringen	6th
SV Ungerhausen	7th
SV Mauerstetten	8th
TSV Lautrach-Illebeuren	9th
SV Oberegg	10th
TSV Legau	11th
FC Blonhofen	12th
ASV Fellheim	13th (relegated)
TV Woringen	14th (relegated)
FSV Lamerdingen	15th (relegated)
