= FC Memmingen =

German association football club

- Full name: Fußball-Club Memmingen 1907 Verein für Leibesübungen e. V.
- Founded: 1907; 119 years ago
- Ground: Memminger Arena
- Capacity: 5,100
- Chairman: Dieter Degenhart
- Manager: Matthias Günes
- League: Regionalliga Bayern (IV)
- 2025–26: Regionalliga Bayern, 12th of 18
Home colours	Away colours

FC Memmingen is a German association football club based in Memmingen, Bavaria.

== History ==
The team was formed on 30 May 1907 as the football department of the gymnastics club Memminger Turnvereins 1859 and became independent in the fall of that year. They re-joined TV on 14 February 1919 before regaining their independence in March 1924 as FC Memmingen 07 Verein für Rasensport und Leibesübungen. The association later adopted its current name, FC Memmingen 07 Verein für Leibesübungen.

Prior to World War II the team captured seven local titles at various levels of play. In 1933 it took part in qualification play for the Gauliga Bayern, one of sixteen new top-flight divisions formed in the re-organization of German football under the Third Reich.

FCM made a first appearance in the top-league of Bavaria in 1953, when, after finishing second in the 2nd Amateurliga Schwaben, the club was admitted to the new Amateurliga Südbayern (III). Its first season there was not very successful and the team found itself relegated after finishing last. It bounced back with a 2nd Amateurliga title in 1955 and a finish at the top of its promotion group. Two good seasons followed with top-five finishes but in 1958, the club was relegated once again. It finished on top of the 2nd Amateurliga once again in 1958, after having to play a decider against TSV Göggingen, which it won.

The two following seasons in the Bayernliga were difficult and the club was relegated once more in 1961. The team remained in the 2nd Amateurliga and qualified for the new tier-four Landesliga Bayern-Süd in 1963.

After a brief drop to the tier-five Bezirksliga from 1966 to 1968, the club recovered and, by winning the Landesliga in 1970, returned to the now single-division Amateurliga Bayern. The team was to remain at this level for the following seventeen years, quite an achievement, but, except for 1980, when it came third, it never finished in the top half of the table. The 1987–88 and 1988–89 seasons were spent in the Landesliga but then the club returned to the Bayernliga once more for the next thirteen seasons.

The club's most successful season came in 1996–97, when they came within a hairsbreadth of advancing to the Regionalliga Süd (III). Memmingen held a 3−2 lead in a promotion playoff versus Kickers Offenbach when the stadium floodlights failed, bringing the match to a premature halt. Offenbach won the subsequent re-play and advanced to the Regionalliga.

After another relegation in 2002 and a one-year stint in the Landesliga, the club returned to the Bayernliga.

In 2007, FC Memmingen celebrated its centenary and inaugurated its refurbished Stadion an der Bodenseestraße with an Allgäu derby match against FC Kempten in front of 6,650 spectators. The club had the best support in the Bayernliga in the 2007–08 season with over 1600 spectators per game.

FC Memmingen holds the record for Oberliga Bayern seasons with its 37th in 2009–10 and also leads the overall table of this league. The club won the Bayernliga title in 2009–10 and thereby earned promotion to the Regionalliga Süd for the first time. In 2012 the club became part of the new Regionalliga Bayern where it played until relegation in 2022.

== Reserve team ==
The club's reserve team, FC Memmingen II, played in the Bezirksoberliga Schwaben (VI) in the 2007–08 season, coming second at the end of season. This finish qualified them for the promotion round, where they lost both games and therefore would have remained in the Bezirksoberliga but due to the third placed team from the Landesliga gaining promotion, too, the FCM II was also promoted. Outclassed in the Landesliga, the team returned to the Bezirksoberliga immediately.

At the end of the 2011–12 season the team qualified for the newly expanded Landesliga after finishing eighth in the Bezirksoberliga and defeating TSV Neusäß in the promotion round.

== Current squad ==
As of 8 September 2026

Note: Flags indicate national team as defined under FIFA eligibility rules; some limited exceptions apply. Players may hold more than one non-FIFA nationality.

No.	Pos.	Nation	Player
1	GK	GER	Felix Unger
2	DF	GER	Max Zeller
3	DF	GER	Jakob Gräser
4	MF	GER	Timo Schmidt
5	MF	GER	Jordan Spitzlberger
6	DF	GER	Rufus Roth
7	FW	GER	Pascal Maier
8	MF	GER	Fabian Lutz
9	FW	GER	Philipp Kirsamer
10	FW	GER	Luis Pfaumann
11	FW	GER	Uros Micic
13	DF	GER	Maximilian Dolinski

No.	Pos.	Nation	Player
14	DF	GER	David Remiger
15	MF	GER	Michael Bergmann
16	MF	GER	Luan Fasaro
17	FW	GER	Luka Petrovic
18	DF	GER	Kim-Bryan Paschek
19	FW	GER	Dominik Martin
20	DF	GER	Jonas Koller
21	MF	GER	Constantin Kresin
22	GK	GER	Dominik Dewein
27	DF	GER	Simon Möst
29	MF	GER	Lukas Rietzler
30	GK	GER	Daniel Keller

== Honours ==
The club's honours:

=== League ===
- Bayernliga (V)
  - Champions: 2010
  - Runners-up: 2023
- Landesliga Bayern-Süd (IV-V)
  - Champions: (2) 1970, 2003
  - Runners-up: 1989
- 2nd Amateurliga Schwaben (IV)
  - Champions: (2) 1955, 1958
- Bezirksoberliga Schwaben (VI)
  - Runners-up: 2008^{‡}

=== Cup ===
- Schwaben Cup
  - Winners: (3) 1958, 1967, 1976
  - Runners-up: (5) 1972, 1993, 1994, 1998, 2006

=== Youth ===
- Bavarian Under 19 championship
  - Runners-up: 2003
- Bavarian Under 15 championship
  - Runners-up: 1998
- ^{‡} Reserve team

== Recent managers ==
Recent managers of the club:

Manager	Start	Finish
Esad Kahric	1 July 2005	15 September 2013
Thomas Rheinhardt Christian Braun	16 September 2013	30 June 2016
Stefan Anderl	1 July 2016	Present

== FC Memmingen seasons ==
The recent season-by-season performance of the club:

=== FC Memmingen ===
Season	Division	Tier	Position
1963–64	Landesliga Bayern-Süd	IV	6th
1964–65	Landesliga Bayern-Süd	IV	11th
1965–66	Landesliga Bayern-Süd	IV	14th ↓
1966–67	Bezirksliga Schwaben	V	
1967–68	Bezirksliga Schwaben	V	2nd ↑
1968–69	Landesliga Bayern-Süd	IV	3rd
1969–70	Landesliga Bayern-Süd	IV	1st ↑
1970–71	Bayernliga	III	9th
1971–72	Bayernliga	III	9th
1972–73	Bayernliga	III	11th
1973–74	Bayernliga	III	12th
1974–75	Bayernliga	III	14th
1975–76	Bayernliga	III	12th
1976–77	Bayernliga	III	10th
1977–78	Bayernliga	III	10th
1978–79	Bayernliga	III	15th
1979–80	Bayernliga	III	3rd
1980–81	Bayernliga	III	11th
1981–82	Bayernliga	III	10th
1982–83	Bayernliga	III	14th
1983–84	Bayernliga	III	14th
1984–85	Bayernliga	III	13th
1985–86	Bayernliga	III	14th
1986–87	Bayernliga	III	15th ↓
1987–88	Landesliga Bayern-Süd	IV	5th
1988–89	Landesliga Bayern-Süd	IV	2nd ↑
1989–90	Bayernliga	III	9th
1990–91	Bayernliga	III	7th
1991–92	Bayernliga	III	11th
1992–93	Bayernliga	III	7th
1993–94	Bayernliga	III	13th
1994–95	Bayernliga	IV	12th

Season	Division	Tier	Position
1995–96	Bayernliga	IV	11th
1996–97	Bayernliga	IV	2nd
1997–98	Bayernliga	IV	15th
1998–99	Bayernliga	IV	8th
1999–2000	Bayernliga	IV	12th
2000–01	Bayernliga	IV	10th
2001–02	Bayernliga	IV	18th ↓
2002–03	Landesliga Bayern-Süd	V	1st ↑
2003–04	Bayernliga	IV	10th
2004–05	Bayernliga	IV	9th
2005–06	Bayernliga	IV	12th
2006–07	Bayernliga	IV	4th
2007–08	Bayernliga	IV	6th
2008–09	Bayernliga	V	3rd
2009–10	Bayernliga	V	1st ↑
2010–11	Regionalliga Süd	IV	13th
2011–12	Regionalliga Süd	IV	15th
2012–13	Regionalliga Bayern	IV	9th
2013–14	Regionalliga Bayern	IV	13th
2014–15	Regionalliga Bayern	IV	7th
2015–16	Regionalliga Bayern	IV	12th
2016–17	Regionalliga Bayern	IV	4th
2017–18	Regionalliga Bayern	IV	16th
2018–19	Regionalliga Bayern	IV	6th
2019–20	Regionalliga Bayern	IV	17th
2020–21	Regionalliga Bayern	IV	15th
2021–22	Regionalliga Bayern	IV	18th ↓
2022–23	Bayernliga	V	2nd ↑
2023–24	Regionalliga Bayern	IV	18th ↓
2024–25	Bayernliga	V	1st ↑
2025–26	Regionalliga Bayern	IV	12th

- The Bayernliga was officially called Amateurliga Bayern until 1978, then Amateur Oberliga Bayern till 1994 and Oberliga Bayern after that.

=== FC Memmingen II ===
Season	Division	Tier	Position
1999–2000	Bezirksoberliga Schwaben	VI	15th ↓
2000–01	Bezirksliga Schwaben-Süd	VII	3rd
2001–02	Bezirksliga Schwaben-Süd	VII	4th
2002–03	Bezirksliga Schwaben-Süd	VII	9th
2003–04	Bezirksliga Schwaben-Süd	VII	1st ↑
2004–05	Bezirksoberliga Schwaben	VI	5th
2005–06	Bezirksoberliga Schwaben	VI	4th
2006–07	Bezirksoberliga Schwaben	VI	3rd
2007–08	Bezirksoberliga Schwaben	VI	2nd ↑
2008–09	Landesliga Bayern-Süd	VI	18th ↓
2009–10	Bezirksoberliga Schwaben	VII	4th
2010–11	Bezirksoberliga Schwaben	VII	6th
2011–12	Bezirksoberliga Schwaben	VII	8th ↑
2012–13	Landesliga Bayern-Südwest	VI	14th
2013–14	Landesliga Bayern-Südwest	VI	6th
2014–15	Landesliga Bayern-Südwest	VI	10th
2015–16	Landesliga Bayern-Südwest	VI	6th
2016–17	Landesliga Bayern-Südwest	VI	

- With the introduction of the Bezirksoberligas in 1988 as the new fifth tier, below the Landesligas, all leagues below dropped one tier. With the introduction of the Regionalligas in 1994 and the 3. Liga in 2008 as the new third tier, below the 2. Bundesliga, all leagues below dropped one tier. With the establishment of the Regionalliga Bayern as the new fourth tier in Bavaria in 2012 the Bayernliga was split into a northern and a southern division, the number of Landesligas expanded from three to five and the Bezirksoberligas abolished. All leagues from the Bezirksligas onwards were elevated one tier.

=== Key ===
↑ Promoted	↓ Relegated
