= List of India international footballers born outside India =

This is a list of football players who represented the India national football team or India national youth football teams (such as India U-23, U-20 and U-17) in international football, and were born outside India.

The following players:

1. have at least one game for the (senior or youth male and female) India international team; and
2. were born outside India.

This list includes players born abroad alongside those, who have become naturalized Indian citizens. The players are ordered per modern-day country of birth; if the country at the time of birth differs from the current, this is indicated with a subsection.

== Players ==
As of 3 August 2026
Players in italics represented India at youth level

=== Australia ===
- Ryan Williams

=== Canada ===
- Sunny Dhaliwal

=== Italy ===
- Aniket Bharti

=== Japan ===
- Arata Izumi

=== Kuwait ===
- Khalid Jamil

=== Nepal ===
- Shyam Thapa

=== Kingdom of Sikkim ===
Born before 1975 merger with India

- Hishey "Jerry" Basi
- Pem Dorji
- Puspa Chhetri

=== Tanzania ===
- Arnold Rodrigues

=== United Arab Emirates ===
- Sahal Abdul Samad
- Mohamed Hateem Ali

== List of countries ==
As of 3 August 2026

Country of birth	Male	Female	Total
Australia	1	0	1
Canada	1	0	1
Italy	1	0	1
Japan	1	0	1
Kuwait	1	0	1
Nepal	1	0	1
Kingdom of Sikkim	2	1	3
Tanzania	1	0	1
United Arab Emirates	2	0	2

== See also ==
- History of Indian football
- List of India international footballers
- List of Indian expatriate footballers
- Overseas Indian representation in Indian sports
