= 1983 Bangladesh President's Gold Cup =

Tournament details
- Host country: Bangladesh
- Dates: 25 August–9 September 1983
- Teams: 10 (from 2 confederations)
- Venue: Dhaka Stadium

Final positions
- Champions: (Iraq) Al-Shorta (1st title)
- Runners-up: Harimau Malaysia

Tournament statistics
- Matches played: 23
- Goals scored: 69 (3 per match)
- Top scorer(s): (Iraq) Nasir Jaseem (Iraq) Karim Nafhai (4 goals)
- Best player: (Iraq) Tarek Salman

The 1983 Bangladesh President's Gold Cup was the third edition of the Bangladesh President's Gold Cup. The event was held at the Dhaka Stadium in Dhaka, Bangladesh.

== Venues ==
Dhaka	1983 Bangladesh President's Gold Cup is located in Bangladesh
Dhaka Stadium	1983 Bangladesh President's Gold Cup is located in Bangladesh
Capacity: 36,000	1983 Bangladesh President's Gold Cup is located in Bangladesh

== Group stage ==
=== Group A ===
Pos	Team	Pld	W	D	L	GF	GA	GD	Pts	Qualification
1	Harimau Malaysia	4	3	0	1	5	2	+3	6	Advance to the semi-finals
2	(England) Middlesex Wanderers	4	3	0	1	6	3	+3	6	Advance to the semi-finals
3	India B	4	2	1	1	7	5	+2	5	
4	(China) Jilin	4	0	2	2	4	8	−4	2	
5	Bangladesh Green	4	0	1	3	5	9	−4	1	

Source: RSSSF
25 August 1983

Harimau Malaysia	2–1	Bangladesh Green
Razip Ismail 14', 79'	Report	Abdul Gaffar

Dhaka Stadium, Dhaka

26 August 1983

Jilin (China)	2–2	India B
Jin Guangzhu 41', 44'	Report	Majood 51'; Afonso 71'

Dhaka Stadium, Dhaka

27 August 1983

Harimau Malaysia	1–0	(England) Middlesex Wanderers
Razip Ismail 81'	Report

Dhaka Stadium, Dhaka

28 August 1983

India B	3–1	Bangladesh Green
Dorji; Afonso; Akum	Report	Joshi

Dhaka Stadium, Dhaka

29 August 1983

Harimau Malaysia	2–0	(China) Jilin
Azlan 13'; Mazalan Bin Man 83' (pen.)	Report

Dhaka Stadium, Dhaka

30 August 1983

Bangladesh Green	1–2	(England) Middlesex Wanderers
Alok 34'	Report	T. Duxon 24'; M. Leslie

Dhaka Stadium, Dhaka

31 August 1983

Harimau Malaysia	0–1	India B
	Report	Biswajit 54'

Dhaka Stadium, Dhaka

1 September 1983

Jilin (China)	0–2	(England) Middlesex Wanderers
	Report	Brandon Green 42'; Walles 84'

Dhaka Stadium, Dhaka

3 September 1983

Jilin (China)	2–2	Bangladesh Green
Cui Jing; Jin Donghao	Report	Joshi; Manik

Dhaka Stadium, Dhaka

4 September 1983

India B	1–2	(England) Middlesex Wanderers
Akum 84'	Report	Russo 15'; Whiteon 42'

Dhaka Stadium, Dhaka

=== Group B ===
Pos	Team	Pld	W	D	L	GF	GA	GD	Pts	Qualification
1	(Iraq) Al-Shorta	4	2	2	0	10	3	+7	6	Advance to the semi-finals
2	(South Korea) Dong-A University	4	2	2	0	7	4	+3	6	Advance to the semi-finals
3	Bangladesh Red	4	1	3	0	6	4	+2	5	
4	Thailand	4	1	1	2	5	7	−2	3	
5	Nepal	4	0	0	4	3	13	−10	0	

Source: RSSSF
25 August 1983

Dong-A University (South Korea)	1–2	Thailand
Ma Rang Muti 61'; Choi Chul Hee 63'	Report	Niwat Kaiphet 28'

Dhaka Stadium, Dhaka

27 August 1983

Al-Shorta (Iraq)	0–0	Bangladesh Red
	Report

Dhaka Stadium, Dhaka

28 August 1983

Dong-A University (South Korea)	2–0	Nepal
Hwang In Eu 37'; Hwang Myung Hee 58'	Report

Dhaka Stadium, Dhaka

29 August 1983

Bangladesh Red	0–0	Thailand
	Report

Dhaka Stadium, Dhaka

30 August 1983

Al-Shorta (Iraq)	1–1	(South Korea) Dong-A University
Tarek Salman 37'	Report	Lee Don Cheol 88'

Dhaka Stadium, Dhaka

31 August 1983

Thailand	2–1	Nepal
Prasong Verapong 72', 85'	Report	Ganesh 38'

Dhaka Stadium, Dhaka

1 September 1983

Dong-A University (South Korea)	2–2	Bangladesh Red
Kim Tae Won; Yang Pu Yung	Report	Aslam; Ashish

Dhaka Stadium, Dhaka

2 September 1983

Al-Shorta (Iraq)	5–0	Nepal
Nasir Jaseem 13', 57', 79'; Karim Nafhai	Report

Dhaka Stadium, Dhaka

4 September 1983

Bangladesh Red	4–2	Nepal
Aslam; Chunnu 34', 44', 73'	Report	Krishna; Ganesh

Dhaka Stadium, Dhaka

5 September 1983

Al-Shorta (Iraq)	4–2	Thailand
Sabah Nazeem 18'; Tarek Salman 32' (pen.), 66'; Karim Nafhai 74'	Report	Dhanachart Chaymongkol; Chairut Sittikul

Dhaka Stadium, Dhaka

== Knockout stage ==
=== Semi-finals ===
6 September 1983

Harimau Malaysia	3–2	(South Korea) Dong-A University
Nasir Yusuf 7'; Nam Dok Eu 54' (o.g.); Azlan 83'	Report	Yang In Eu 40'; Choi Jung Yung 67'

Dhaka Stadium, Dhaka

8 September 1983

Al-Shorta (Iraq)	2–2 (a.e.t.)	(England) Middlesex Wanderers
Karim Nafhai 56'; Adnan Khadum 117'	Report	Whiteon 3', 93'
Penalties
Waleed Tameer (penalty scored); Nasir Jaseem (penalty scored); Karim Nafhai (penalty scored); Adnan Khadum (penalty scored); Mohammed Fadel (penalty scored)	5–3	Whiteon (penalty scored); Taylor (penalty scored); Brandon Green (penalty scored); Marek (penalty missed)

Dhaka Stadium, Dhaka

=== Final ===
9 September 1983

Harimau Malaysia	0–2	(Iraq) Al-Shorta
	Report	Nasir Jaseem 19'; Adnan Khadum 70'

Dhaka Stadium, Dhaka

== Statistics ==
=== Goalscorers ===
There were 69 goals scored in 23 matches, for an average of 3 goals per match.

4 goals

- (Iraq) Karim Nafhai
- (Iraq) Nasir Jaseem

3 goals

- (Bangladesh) Ashraf Uddin Ahmed Chunnu
- (Iraq) Tarek Salman
- (England) Whiteon
- (Malaysia) Razip Ismail

2 goals

- (Iraq) Adnan Khadum
- (Bangladesh) Sheikh Mohammad Aslam
- (Nepal) Ganesh Thapa
- (Thailand) Prasong Verapong
- (Bangladesh) Kazi Jasimuddin Ahmed Joshi
- (Malaysia) Azlan Johar
- (India) Akum
- (India) Mauricio Afonso
- (China) Jin Guangzhu

1 goal

- (South Korea) Choi Jung Yung
- (South Korea) Yang In Eu
- (Malaysia) Nasir Yusuf
- (Thailand) Chairut Sittikul
- (Thailand) Dhanachart Chaymongkol
- (Iraq) Sabah Nazeem
- (Nepal) Krishna Thapa
- (Bangladesh) Ashish Bhadra
- (South Korea) Yang Pu Yung
- (South Korea) Kim Tae Won
- (South Korea) Lee Don Cheol
- (South Korea) Hwang Myung Hee
- (South Korea) Hwang In Eu
- (Thailand) Niwat Kaiphet
- (South Korea) Choi Chul Hee
- (South Korea) Ma Rang Muti
- (Bangladesh) Shafiqul Islam Manik
- (England) Russo
- (China) Jin Donghao
- (China) Cui Jing
- (England) Walles
- (England) Brandon Green
- (India) Biswajit Bhattacharya
- (England) M. Leslie
- (England) T. Duxon
- (Bangladesh) Nazir Ahmed Alok
- (Malaysia) Mazalan Bin Man
- (India) Pem Dorji
- (India) Majood
- (Bangladesh) Abdul Gaffar

1 own goal

- (South Korea) Nam Dok Eu (against Harimau Malaysia)
