= List of Indian expatriate footballers =

This is a list of Indian football players (both men and women) who are currently playing or have played for any football club abroad, in any competitive foreign football league.

- Players below, have signed, joined or appeared as foreign recruits (footballer) for any football club – that is not based in India (irrespective of whether the player has made an appearance for the team or not).

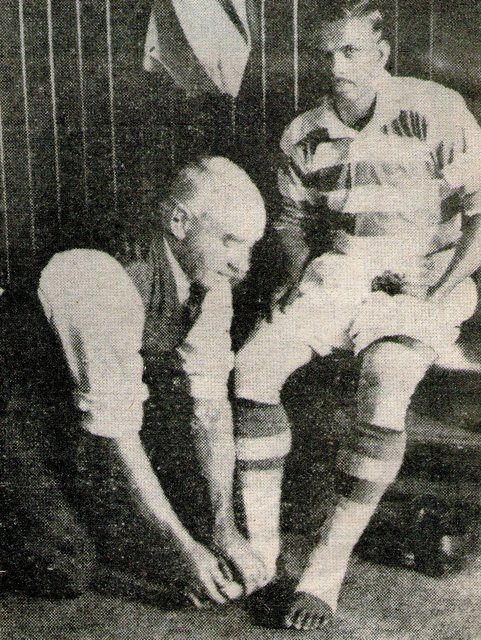
Mohammed Salim, the first Indian footballer to play for an overseas club, signed with Celtic of Scotland in 1936.

- Few players below, within "Youth men" and "Youth women" sections, have played or currently playing College soccer in professional/amateur college/university conference leagues outside India.

== Senior men ==
As of 21 June 2024

=== Past ===
Name	Clubs	Leagues	Countries	Years
Mohammed Salim	Celtic F.C.	Scottish Football League	Scotland	1936
Johnny Lobo	Nairobi Heroes FC	Nairobi District League	British Kenya (now Kenya)	1947–49
Syed Abdul Rahim	HSV Hoek	Dutch Amateur League	Netherlands	1950
Tarapada Roy	Wari Club Dhaka	Dhaka First Division League	East Pakistan (now Bangladesh)	1950–53
Taj Mohammed	Muslim Club Quetta		Pakistan	1950–52
Taj Mohammed	Afghan Club Quetta		Pakistan	1953–54
Taj Mohammed	Karachi Kickers		Pakistan	1955–56
Taj Mohammed	Balochistan	National Football Championship	Pakistan	1950s
Taj Mohammed	Pakistan Railways	National Football Championship	Pakistan	1957–58
Dominic Soares	Dar es Salaam Goan SC	Dar es Salaam Football League	(Tanganyika (1961–1964)) Tanganyika (now Tanzania)	1960–62
Dominic Soares	Wanderers FC	Dar es Salaam Football League	(Tanganyika (1961–1964)) Tanganyika (now Tanzania)	1962–63
Dominic Soares	Cosmopolitan FC	Dar es Salaam Football League	(Tanganyika (1961–1964)) Tanganyika (now Tanzania)	1963–66
Balai Dey	Khulna Heroes Club	Khulna First Division League	East Pakistan (now Bangladesh)	1961–62
Balai Dey	Mohammedan Sporting Dhaka	Dhaka First Division League	East Pakistan (now Bangladesh)	1962, 1963–64
Balai Dey	Khulna Town Club	Khulna First Division League	East Pakistan (now Bangladesh)	1963
Mohammed Rahmatullah	Mohammedan Sporting Dhaka	Dhaka First Division League	East Pakistan (now Bangladesh)	1963–64
Mohammed Rahmatullah	Dhaka Wanderers Club	Dhaka First Division League	East Pakistan (now Bangladesh)	1965–66
Trevor Fernandes	Kikwajuni SC	Zanzibar First Division League	Zanzibar (now Tanzania)	1965
Jamshid Nassiri	Rastakhiz Khorramshahr	Jâm-e Taxt-e Jamšid	Iran	1977–79
Pem Dorji	Mahendra Police Club	Martyr's Memorial League	Nepal	1978–79
Goutam Mukherjee	Food Corporation of Bhutan FC	Thimphu A Division League	Bhutan	1979–80
Kavungal Abdul Aziz	Mohammedan Sporting Dhaka	Dhaka First Division League	Bangladesh	1981
Shabbir Ali	Victoria SC	Dhaka First Division League	Bangladesh	1984–85
Arnold Rodrigues	Croydon FC	Isthmian Football League	England	1984–89
Arnold Rodrigues	Simba Sports Club	Non-League football	England	1995–04
Bhaskar Ganguly	Abahani Krira Chakra	Dhaka First Division League	Bangladesh	1986
Monoranjan Bhattacharya	Abahani Krira Chakra	Dhaka First Division League	Bangladesh	1986
Hemendra Kumar Hari Bica	F.C. Ferreiras	Terceira Divisão Portuguesa	Portugal	1995–96, 2002–03, 2008–09
Hemendra Kumar Hari Bica	FC Albernoense	Beja distrito 2ª divisão	Portugal	2009–10
Roberto Fernandes	Atlético Morelia	Primera División	Mexico	1997–98
Roberto Fernandes	C.F. Monterrey	Primera División	Mexico	1998
Roberto Fernandes	San Pedro Seahawks	Belize Premier Football League	Belize	2000–01
Dipankar Biswas	Badda Jagoroni Sangsad	Dhaka Premier Division League	Bangladesh	1998–99
Arpan Dey	Muktijoddha Sangsad KC	Dhaka Premier Division League	Bangladesh	1999–00
Syed Sabir Pasha	Abahani Limited Dhaka	Dhaka Premier Division League	Bangladesh	1999–00
Bhaichung Bhutia	Bury FC	Football League Second Division	England	1999–02
Bhaichung Bhutia	Perak F.A.	Liga Perdana 1	Malaysia	2003
Bhaichung Bhutia	Selangor MK Land	Malaysia Premier League	Malaysia	2005
I. M. Vijayan	Muktijoddha Sangsad KC	Dhaka Premier Division League	Bangladesh	2000
Ishan Rawlley Singh	Pershore Town F.C.	Midland Football Combination League	England	2004–05
Shaji Varghese	Renown SC Colombo	Sri Lanka Champions League	Sri Lanka	2004–05
Shibu Stellas	Renown SC Colombo	Sri Lanka Champions League	Sri Lanka	2004–05
Shyam Simon	Renown SC Colombo	Sri Lanka Champions League	Sri Lanka	2004–05
Arata Izumi	Albirex Niigata Singapore FC	Singapore Premier League	Singapore	2005
Arata Izumi	Mitsubishi Mizushima FC	Japan Football League	Japan	2006
Manprit Singh	Wofoo Tai Po	Hong Kong First Division League	Hong Kong	2006
Manprit Singh	Hong Kong FC	Hong Kong First Division League	Hong Kong	2006
Manprit Singh	Hong Kong Rangers FC	Hong Kong First Division League	Hong Kong	2006–07
Samson Raj	FC Ros Bila Tserkva	Ukrainian Second League	Ukraine	2009
Rajib Ghosh	Mohammedan Sporting Dhaka	Bangladesh Premier League	Bangladesh	2009–10
Varinder Singh	SSG Halvestorf-Herkendorf	Bezirksliga Hannover	Germany	2009–10
Varinder Singh	Preußen Hameln	Kreisliga Hameln-Pyrmont	Germany	2010
Varinder Singh	TuS Hessisch Oldendorf	Kreisliga Hameln-Pyrmont	Germany	2011–13
Varinder Singh	SV Lachem/Haverbeck	3. Kreisliga	Germany	2013–15
Ram Jack Sinh	Haiphong FC	V.League 1	Vietnam	2010–11
Narinder Singh	JFV Hamburg Oststeinbek	Verbandsliga Hamburg	Germany	2010–11
Narinder Singh	Forest Town FC	Central Midlands Football League	England	2011
Sunil Chhetri	Kansas City Wizards	Major League Soccer	United States	2010
Sunil Chhetri	Sporting CP B	Liga Portugal 2	Portugal	2013–14
Nikhil Suresh	SE Calcio	Eccellenza	Italy	2011
Arvind Rathore	FC Honka	Veikkausliiga	Finland	2011
Syamsul Huda	Persema Malang	Indonesian Premier League	Indonesia	2011–12
Varin Mehta	Royal Antwerp FC	Belgian First Division B	Belgium	2011–12
Ankit Sharma	Deportivo San Cristóbal de los Ángeles	Divisiones Regionales de Fútbol in the Community of Madrid	Spain	2011–12
Avian Singh	Brampton City United FC	Canadian Soccer League	Canada	2011–13
Sunil Luthra	Post SV Hamburg	Bezirksliga Schwaben-Nord	Germany	2011–12
Sunil Luthra	Post SV Hamburg II	Kreisklasse B Hamburg	Germany	2012–13
Duleep Menon	Salford City F.C.	Northern Premier League	England	2011–12
Duleep Menon	East Manchester FC	Manchester Football League Division 1	England	2013–14
Piradeep Siva Anandan	SV Viktoria Preußen 07	Kreisoberliga Frankfurt	Germany	2011–12
Piradeep Siva Anandan	SV Blau-Gelb Frankfurt	Kreisoberliga Frankfurt	Germany	2012–14
Piradeep Siva Anandan	SpVgg 03 Fechenheim	Kreisoberliga Frankfurt	Germany	2014–15
Pratik Shinde	Galveston Pirate SC	National Premier Soccer League	United States	2011–13
Pratik Shinde	Houston Hurricanes	National Premier Soccer League	United States	2013–14, 2016–17
Adnan Hiroli	Taff's Well A.F.C.	Cymru South	Wales	2011–12
Adnan Hiroli	Yate Town F.C.	Southern Football League	England	2012–13
Adnan Hiroli	Mangotsfield United F.C.	Southern Football League	England	2013–14
Adnan Hiroli	Odd Down A.F.C.	Western Football League	England	2014–20
Amit Kumar	TSV Germania Windeck II	Kreisliga A North Rhine-Westphalia	Germany	2011–13
Amit Kumar	SV 1919 Öttershagen	Kreisliga C North Rhine-Westphalia	Germany	2013–14
Amit Kumar	TuS 1913 Schladern	Kreisliga C North Rhine-Westphalia	Germany	2014–21
Veeru Singh Baidwan	Windsor FC	Combined Counties Football League	England	2012
Dheeraj Aloysius	Real Caribe SC	Long Island Soccer League	United States	2012
Adit Rastogi	Kaposvári Rákóczi FC II	Nemzeti Bajnokság II	Hungary	2012–13
Rajith Roshanth	Batenbrocker RuhrpottKicker II	Kreisliga C Kreis Oberhausen-Bottrop	Germany	2012–13
Arshdeep Singh	ASD Chiampo	Seconda Categoria	Italy	2012–14
Ajay Singh	Glasgow Springburn FC	Glasgow & District Sunday Football Championship	Scotland	2012–13
Ajay Singh	Yoker Amateur FC	Glasgow & District Sunday Football Championship	Scotland	2013–14
Ravjit Singh Dhinsa	SC Fortuna Bonn	Kreisliga B	Germany	2012–13
Ravjit Singh Dhinsa	FV Vaalserquartier	Bezirksliga Mittelrhein	Germany	2013–16
Ravjit Singh Dhinsa	Bonner SC	Regionalliga West	Germany	2016–17
Fredy Mascarenhas	Robin Hood F.C.	Bermudian Premier Division	Bermuda	2012–15
Fredy Mascarenhas	X-Roads Warriors FC	Bermudian Premier Division	Bermuda	2015–18
Navninder Singh Mann	Strømsgodset Toppfotball	Tippeligaen	Norway	2012
Navninder Singh Mann	Siddis Sportsklubb	Norwegian Fourth Division	Norway	2019–21
Aswin Gimber	VF Leibesübungen Alfter 1925 e.V.	Fußball-Mittelrheinliga	Germany	2012–13
Aswin Gimber	SV Lachem/Haverbeck	3. Kreisliga	Germany	2013–15
Aswin Gimber	SV Bavenstedt	Landesliga Hannover	Germany	2015–17
Aswin Gimber	Oststädter Sportverein Hannover	Landesliga Hannover	Germany	2017–18
Aswin Gimber	SV Bavenstedt II	Bezirksliga Hanover 2	Germany	2018–19
Aswin Gimber	TuSpo Schliekum von 1900 e.V.	Bezirksliga Hanover 2	Germany	2019–20
Aswin Gimber	VfL Borsum e.V.	Kreisliga Hildesheim	Germany	2020–2
Jaspreet Singh Sandhu	CSD Uesse Sarnico	Eccellenza	Italy	2013
Faiz Alam	Uttar Baridhara Club	Bangladesh Premier League	Bangladesh	2013–14
Imtiaz Quasim	Uttar Baridhara Club	Bangladesh Premier League	Bangladesh	2013–14
Brandon Fernandes	ASD Cape Town FC	SAFA Second Division	South Africa	2013–14
Kilp Barfungpa	TuS Koblenz II	Oberliga Rheinland-Pfalz/Saar	Germany	2013–14
Kilp Barfungpa	Paro FC	Bhutan Premier League	Bhutan	2018–19
Prabin Tsering Bhutia	TSV Gräfelfing	Kreisliga 2 München	Germany	2013–14
Prabin Tsering Bhutia	BC Aichach	Kreisliga 2 München	Germany	2014–15
Prabin Tsering Bhutia	TSV Großhadern	Kreisliga Schwaben-Ost	Germany	2015–18
Prabin Tsering Bhutia	FC Anadolu Bayern	Bezirksliga Oberbayern-Süd	Germany	2018–19
Mohammad-Mostafa Nawazy	FC Can Mozaik e.V.	Bezirksliga Lower Saxony	Germany	2013, 2014–15
Mohammad-Mostafa Nawazy	Oststädter Sportverein Hannover	Landesliga Hannover	Germany	2013, 2015–17
Mohammad-Mostafa Nawazy	FC Stern Misburg 1913 e.V.	Regionalliga Bayern	Germany	2017–18
Mohammad-Mostafa Nawazy	TSV Kleinburgwedel	1. Kreisklasse Lower Saxony	Germany	2019–21
Mohammad-Mostafa Nawazy	Friedenauer TSC 1886 e.V.	Landesliga Berlin Staffel 1	Germany	2021–22
Subrata Pal	FC Vestsjælland	Danish Superliga	Denmark	2014
Amritpal Singh Chhina	Geelong SC	National Premier Leagues Victoria 3	Australia	2014
Israil Gurung	Vitória de Guimarães B	Segunda Liga	Portugal	2014–15
Manish Maithani	Vitória de Guimarães B	Segunda Liga	Portugal	2014–15
Gurpreet Singh Sandhu	Stabæk	Eliteserien	Norway	2014–17
Anupam Sarkar	FC Adeli Batumi	Pirveli Liga	Georgia	2015
Romeo Fernandes	Atlético Paranaense	Série A	Brazil	2015
Renedy Singh	CSKA Sofia	Bulgarian First League	Bulgaria	2015
Kean Lewis	Inter Acapulco	Liga Premier de México	Mexico	2015
Kean Lewis	Laredo Heat	National Premier Soccer League	United States	2015
Vishant Gianchandani	Union Sportive Sandweiler	Luxembourg Division of Honour	Luxembourg	2015–17, 2019–21
Vishant Gianchandani	FC Blo-Wäiss Izeg	Luxembourg Division of Honour	Luxembourg	2017–19
Sandip Chandani	UE Extremenya	Segona Divisió	Andorra	2015–16
Sandip Chandani	FS La Massana	Segona Divisió	Andorra	2016–17
Sandip Chandani	Penya Encarnada d'Andorra	Lliga Nacional de Fútbol	Andorra	2017–18
Sandip Chandani	CE Carroi	Lliga Nacional de Fútbol	Andorra	2018–19
Abneet Bharti	S.U. Sintrense	Campeonato de Portugal	Portugal	2017–19
Abneet Bharti	FK Varnsdorf	Czech National Football League	Czech Republic	2021–24
Abneet Bharti	Talant Tash-Kömür	BC Olimp Premier League	Kyrgyzstan	2022
Abneet Bharti	Club Deportivo del Este	Liga Panameña de Fútbol	Panama	2023
Abneet Bharti	Deportivo Sol de Mayo	Torneo Federal A	Argentina	2024
Abneet Bharti	Atlético El Linqueño	Torneo Federal A	Argentina	2025
Abneet Bharti	Academia del Balompié Boliviano	Bolivian Primera División	Bolivia	2025
Siddharth Singh	Manningham United	National Premier Leagues Victoria 2	Australia	2016–17
Julius Nelson Raju	Niendorfer TSV II	Landesliga Hamburg-Hammonia	Germany	2016–17
Deep Moorjani	Castelo Forte FC	AF Lisboa 2° Divisão	Portugal	2016–17
Gautam Medikonda	Castelo Forte FC	AF Lisboa 2° Divisão	Portugal	2016–17
Dron Bhardwaj	SV Burggrafenhof e.V.	2. Kreisliga Bavaria	Germany	2016–17
Andrew Kyle Silva	Castelo Forte FC	AF Lisboa 2° Divisão	Portugal	2016–17
Vansh Shrisvastava	Castelo Forte FC	AF Lisboa 2° Divisão	Portugal	2016–17
Yuvraj Singh Saraon	Penya Blaugrana Vallirana	Tercera División	Spain	2016–17
Kamaljit Singh	SV Union wages Lohne	Bezirksliga Weser-Ems	Germany	2016–17
Kamaljit Singh	BSV Schwarz-Weiß Rehden	Regionalliga Nord	Germany	2017–18
Pranav Kotra	Cove FC	National Premier Leagues South Australia	Australia	2016–17
Pranav Kotra	Adelaide University SC	South Australian Regional Leagues	Australia	2017
Pranav Kotra	Northern Demons SC	South Australian State League 2	Australia	2017–18
Suhayl Hussainali Dholkawala	AD Oeiras	AF Lisboa 2° Divisão	Portugal	2016
Suhayl Hussainali Dholkawala	Sacavenense B	AF Lisboa 2° Divisão	Portugal	2016–17
Suhayl Hussainali Dholkawala	Porto Salvo	AF Lisboa 2° Divisão	Portugal	2017–18
Suhayl Hussainali Dholkawala	GS Carcavelos	AF Lisboa 2° Divisão	Portugal	2018–19
Suhayl Hussainali Dholkawala	União dos Santos	AF Lisboa 3ª Divisão	Portugal	2019–20
Vedaant Nag	TuS Bad Aibling	Landesliga Bayern-Südost	Germany	2016–17
Vedaant Nag	SV-DJK Kolbermoor	Landesliga Bayern-Südost	Germany	2017
Vedaant Nag	SB/DJK Rosenheim	Landesliga Bayern-Südost	Germany	2018–19
Vedaant Nag	SB Chiemgau Traunstein	Landesliga Bayern-Südost	Germany	2019–20
Royston D'Souza	Eastern Suburbs AFC	Northern League	New Zealand	2016–19, 2022–23
Royston D'Souza	Fencibles United	NRFL Division 2	New Zealand	2020–22
Nagen Tamang	Transport United	Bhutan Premier League	Bhutan	2017
Mihir Singh Jain	USD Monferrato	Prima Categoria	Italy	2017
Basit Ahmed	SD Lenense	Tercera Federación	Spain	2017
Muhammed Asrar Rehbar	SD Lenense	Tercera Federación	Spain	2017
Anshuman Thapa	Hollands & Blair F.C.	Southern Counties East Football League	England	2017–18
Saurav Gopalakrishnan	CD Almuñécar City	Tercer Andaluza Granada	Spain	2017–18
Rajbir Singh Dhanju	1. Salzburger SK	2. Klasse Nord	Austria	2017–18
Rajbir Singh Dhanju	UFC Leopoldskron-Moos	Salzburger Liga	Austria	2018
Kavan Patel	SG Grün-Weiß Dessau	Kreisliga D Anhalt	Germany	2017
Kavan Patel	SV Dessau 05	Verbandsliga Sachsen-Anhalt	Germany	2018–19
Mahroos Siddiquee Nadim	FC Struga	Macedonian First Football League	North Macedonia	2020–21
Ishaan Sahi	Unió Esportiva Calonge	Tercera Catalana	Spain	2017–18
Ishaan Sahi	Palamós CF	Tercera División RFEF	Spain	2018–19
Vidipt Dua	Oberkasseler FV	Landesliga	Germany	2017
Vidipt Dua	TSV Germania Windeck	Oberliga Mittelrhein	Germany	2017–18
Vidipt Dua	Olímpic de Xàtiva B	Regional Preferente	Spain	2018–19
Rahul Saini	VfL Fontana Finthen	Verbandsliga Südwest	Germany	2017–19
Krishna Chaudhary	Marcet Escuela de Fútbol	Tercera División RFEF	Spain	2017–20
Tarun Ludhwani	Atlético Porto Salvo	Porto FA Elite Division	Portugal	2017–18
Tarun Ludhwani	União dos Santos	Porto FA Elite Division	Portugal	2019–20
Jayan Varghese	Eunos Crescent FC	Singapore National Football League	Singapore	2017–18
Jayan Varghese	Singapore Katong FC	Singapore National Football League	Singapore	2018–19
Jayan Varghese	Balestier Khalsa (R)	Singapore National Football League	Singapore	2019
Jayan Varghese	Jungfrau Punggol FC	Singapore National Football League	Singapore	2019–20
Pandia Rajan Sivaprahasan	Associação Desportiva de Santiais	AF Aveiro 2.ª Divisão	Portugal	2017–19
Pandia Rajan Sivaprahasan	FC Vaguense	AF Aveiro 2.ª Divisão	Portugal	2019, 2021–22
Pandia Rajan Sivaprahasan	G.D. Gafanha	Campeonato de Portugal	Portugal	2019–20
Jagroop Singh	SV Blau-Weiß Spandau	Berlin-Liga	Germany	2017–19
Jagroop Singh	Tennis Borussia Berlin	NOFV-Oberliga Nord	Germany	2019–20
Karthik Thulasi	FC Nizwa	Oman First Division League	Oman	2017–18
Karthik Thulasi	Club Deportivo Proas	Tercera División	Spain	2020–21
Gurjinder Singh	Platanias F.C.	Football League Greece	Greece	2017–19
Gurjinder Singh	AEEK SYN.KA	Gamma Ethniki	Greece	2019–20
Gurjinder Singh	Ionikos F.C.	Super League Greece 2	Greece	2020–21
Gurjinder Singh	P.A.E. G.S. Diagoras	Super League Greece 2	Greece	2021–22
Gurjinder Singh	Proodeftiki F.C.	Super League Greece 2	Greece	2022–23
Rubal Masih	UC Lugagnano	Promozione	Italy	2017–23
Sisank Kotwal	NAPA Rovers	Guam Soccer League	Guam	2017–23
Godwin Franco	Guadalupe F.C.	Liga Promérica	Costa Rica	2018
Jasjot Padda	FC Gundelfingen	Landesliga Bayern-Südost	Germany	2018–19
Pema Wongyal Bhutia	Phuentsholing United FC	Bhutan Premier League	Bhutan	2018–19
Sukraj Subba	Phuentsholing United FC	Bhutan Premier League	Bhutan	2018–19
Sangay Chopel	Phuentsholing United FC	Bhutan Premier League	Bhutan	2018–19
Pujan Pradhan	Phuentsholing United FC	Bhutan Premier League	Bhutan	2018–19
Swapnil Raj Dhaka	FK Sinđelić Beograd	Serbian League Belgrade	Serbia	2018–19
Amarjeet Mishra	C.D. Estrela	AF Lisboa 1ª Divisão	Portugal	2018–19
Sahil Tavora	G.D. Santa Cruz de Alvarenga	Campeonato de Portugal	Portugal	2018–19
Sunny Dhaliwal	Toronto Skillz	League1 Ontario	Canada	2018–19
Shorayav Bharadwaj	Fundació Esportiva Palamós	Divisiones Regionales de Fútbol	Spain	2018–19
Tushar Negi	Fundació Esportiva Palamós	Divisiones Regionales de Fútbol	Spain	2018–19
Gagandeep Singh	Olímpic de Xàtiva B	Regional Preferente	Spain	2018–19
Vivek Rana	SV Berlin-Chemie Adlershof II	Kreisliga C	Germany	2018–20
Atharv Dandekar	CF Martinenc	Regional Preferente de la Comunidad Valenciana	Spain	2018–20
Nihal Colaco	Deportiu Montcada	Primera Catalana	Spain	2018–20
Suraj Rasaili	Transport United FC	Bhutan Premier League	Bhutan	2018–20
Shaunak Gupta	GS de Carcavelos	AF Lisboa 2° Divisão	Portugal	2018–19
Shaunak Gupta	União dos Santos	AF Lisboa 3ª Divisão	Portugal	2019–20
Kabir Kohli	Club Deportivo Llosa	Regional Preferente de la Comunidad Valenciana	Spain	2018–19
Kabir Kohli	CD Olímpic de Xàtiva	Tercera División	Spain	2019–20
Muhammad Asif	Manang Marshyangdi Club	Martyr's Memorial A-Division League	Nepal	2018–19
Muhammad Asif	Chyasal Youth Club	Martyr's Memorial A-Division League	Nepal	2019–20
Pawanvir Singh	All Black FC	Hong Kong Third Division League	Hong Kong	2018–21
Elliot Pereira	Porto Salvo	AF Lisboa 2ª Divisão	Portugal	2018–19
Elliot Pereira	União dos Santos	AF Lisboa 3ª Divisão	Portugal	2019–20
Elliot Pereira	Respira O2	AF Lisboa 3ª Divisão	Portugal	2020–21
Akashdeep Singh	U.S.D. Vigor Carpaneto 1922	Serie D	Italy	2018–19
Akashdeep Singh	Borgo San Donnino FC	Serie D	Italy	2020–21
Akashdeep Singh	ASD Salsomaggiore Calcio	Serie D	Italy	2021–22
Anshul Sachdev	Palamós CF	Segona Catalana	Spain	2018–19, 2020–21
Anshul Sachdev	CP Villarrobledo B	Primera Autonómica Preferente	Spain	2021–23
Norbu Lepcha	Transport United FC	Bhutan Premier League	Bhutan	2018–23
Aryaman Trehan	G.D. Estoril Praia B	AF Lisboa 2ª Divisão	Portugal	2018–20
Aryaman Trehan	SC de Viana	AF Évora Elite Divisão	Portugal	2020–22
Aryaman Trehan	GD Águias do Moradal	AF Castelo Branco 1ª Divisão	Portugal	2022–23
Aryaman Trehan	Atlético Esperança	AF Coimbra Divisão Honra	Portugal	2023–24
Kabir Nath	CF Reddis	Primera Catalana	Spain	2018–19
Kabir Nath	CD Olímpic de Xàtiva	Tercera División RFEF	Spain	2019–20
Kabir Nath	Palamós CF	Primera Catalana	Spain	2020–21
Kabir Nath	UE Engordany	Primera Divisió	Andorra	2021–22
Kabir Nath	Villajoyosa CF	Regional Preferente	Spain	2021–22
Kabir Nath	CD Tortosa	Primera Catalana	Spain	2022
Kabir Nath	Tarragona	Tercera Catalana	Spain	2022–23
Kabir Nath	FC Ascó	Primera Catalana	Spain	2023
Kabir Nath	CF Atlètic Amèrica	Primera Divisió	Andorra	2023–24
Kabir Nath	FS La Massana	Primera Divisió	Andorra	2024–25
Arvind Amaranathan	Kitchee SC	Hong Kong Premier League	Hong Kong	2019
Khaidem Vicky Meitei	High Quality United FC	Bhutan Premier League	Bhutan	2019
Amarjit Singh	Bramfelder SV	Landesliga Nordost	Germany	2019
Swamya Hardik Singh	Kemi City F.C.	Kolmonen	Finland	2019–20
Armaan Singh Khangura	Kelen SC	Nemzeti Bajnokság III	Hungary	2019–20
Ishan Pandita	Gimnàstic de Tarragona II	Tercera División RFEF	Spain	2019
Ishan Pandita	CF Pobla de Mafumet	Tercera División RFEF	Spain	2019
Ishan Pandita	Lorca FC	Tercera División RFEF	Spain	2019–20
Parminder Singh	Druk Stars FC	Bhutan Premier League	Bhutan	2019–20
Varshil Trambadyia	União dos Santos	AF Lisboa 3ª Divisão	Portugal	2019–20
Rutvik Kalaria	União dos Santos	AF Lisboa 3ª Divisão	Portugal	2019–20
Aryan Gupta	CD Leganés B	Tercera División RFEF	Spain	2019–20
Shivam Sanjeevkumar Rai	Hellas United Hamburg	Kreisklasse B Hamburg	Germany	2019–20
Ashiq Ashraf	CF Reddis	Primera Catalana	Spain	2019–20
Kuber Bisht	Jawalakhel YC	Martyr's Memorial A-Division League	Nepal	2019–20
Lunkim Seigoulun Khongsai	CD Olímpic de Xàtiva	Tercera División RFEF	Spain	2019–20
Prahlad Roy	Sankata Boys S.C.	Martyr's Memorial A-Division League	Nepal	2019–20
Lal Rammarva	Three Star Club	Martyr's Memorial A-Division League	Nepal	2019–20
Mohammad Saukat	Brigade Boys Club	Martyr's Memorial A-Division League	Nepal	2019–20
Raj Balasubramanian	DJK Rhenania Kleve	Kreisliga C1 Kleve	Germany	2019–20
Laishram Milan Singh	High Quality United FC	Bhutan Premier League	Bhutan	2019–20
Nima Dorji Tamang	High Quality United FC	Bhutan Premier League	Bhutan	2019–20
Muhammed Rashid Nalakath	High Quality United FC	Bhutan Premier League	Bhutan	2019–20
Ashiq Muhammad	High Quality United FC	Bhutan Premier League	Bhutan	2019–20
Ningthoujam Naresh Singh	High Quality United FC	Bhutan Premier League	Bhutan	2019–20
Paramvir Das	SG Süggerath-Tripsrath	Kreisliga C Westfalen	Germany	2019–20
Kabir Aswani	União dos Santos	AF Lisboa 2ª Divisão	Portugal	2019–20
Sampras Singh	SV Auersmacher	Saarlandliga	Germany	2019–21
Romir Goswami	Sporting Clube de Macau	Liga de Elite	Macau	2019–21
Prajwal Dey	SG Süggerath-Tripsrath	Kreisliga C Westfalen	Germany	2019–21
Aniket Admane	Arsenal da Devesa	AF Braga 1ª Divisão	Portugal	2019–20
Aniket Admane	ACRD Arsenal de Crespos	AF Braga 1ª Divisão	Portugal	2020–21
Yaksh Sheoran	SG Süggerath-Tripsrath	Kreisliga C Westfalen	Germany	2019
Yaksh Sheoran	SC Stetternich	Kreisliga C Westfalen	Germany	2019–21
Sharanjit Singh Badwal	SC Elite Wien	Austrian 2. Landesliga	Austria	2019–20
Sharanjit Singh Badwal	AS Koma Elektra	Austrian Regionalliga	Austria	2020
Sharanjit Singh Badwal	SC Süßenbrunn	Austrian Regionalliga	Austria	2020–21
Palanganda Pragath Subbaiya	Kasem Bundit University F.C.	Thai League 3	Thailand	2019–22
Dhirpal Shah	Inter Taoyuan	Taiwan Second Division Football League	Chinese Taipei	2019–20
Dhirpal Shah	Taipei Tatung	Taiwan Football Premier League	Chinese Taipei	2020–22
Uttam Rai	Friends Club Kopundole	Martyr's Memorial A-Division League	Nepal	2019–20
Uttam Rai	Sankata Boys S.C.	Martyr's Memorial A-Division League	Nepal	2021–22
Brian Damian Ellens	Centro Recreativo e Acção Cultural	AF Aveiro 1ª Divisão	Portugal	2019–20
Brian Damian Ellens	G.D. Gafanha	Campeonato de Portugal	Portugal	2020–21
Brian Damian Ellens	FC Vaguense	AF Aveiro 2ª Divisão South	Portugal	2021–22
Lalrammawia Rammawia	Three Star Club	Martyr's Memorial A-Division League	Nepal	2019–20, 2021–22
Vinay Singh	MFK Lokomotíva Zvolen	3. Liga	Slovakia	2019–21
Vinay Singh	OFK Dunajská Lužná	3. Liga	Slovakia	2021–22
Shaliyanth Modugula Reddy	TuS Bad Aibling e.V.	Bezirksliga Oberbayern-Ost	Germany	2019–21
Shaliyanth Modugula Reddy	SV Bruckmühl	Landesliga Bayern-Süd	Germany	2021–22
Dayananda Singh Elangbam	Manang Marshyangdi Club	Martyr's Memorial A-Division League	Nepal	2019–20, 2021–22
Dayananda Singh Elangbam	Machhindra F.C.	Martyr's Memorial A-Division League	Nepal	2023
Muhammed Sagar Ali	Druk Stars FC	Bhutan Premier League	Bhutan	2019–20
Muhammed Sagar Ali	FC Takin	Bhutan Premier League	Bhutan	2022–23
Raunak Vivek Nagul	União dos Santos	AF Lisboa 2ª Divisão	Portugal	2019–20
Raunak Vivek Nagul	GMID Abóboda	AF Lisboa 2ª Divisão	Portugal	2020–21
Raunak Vivek Nagul	União Recreativa Mirense	AF Leiria Divisão de Honra	Portugal	2022–23
Aaryan Saroha	CDA Navalcarnero	Segunda Federación	Spain	2019–20
Aaryan Saroha	CD Leganés B	Segunda Federación	Spain	2020–21
Aaryan Saroha	Aravaca CF	Categoría Preferente de Aficionados	Spain	2021–22
Aaryan Saroha	CF Pozuelo de Alarcón	Tercera Federación	Spain	2022–23
Sanjeev Stalin	C.D. Aves	Primeira Liga	Portugal	2020
Sanjeev Stalin	Sertanense F.C.	Campeonato de Portugal	Portugal	2020
Harbamon Timung	CD Olímpic de Xàtiva	Tercera División	Spain	2020
Dhanraj Dhurve	FC Centaur Moskau	Russian Amateur Football League	Russia	2020
Nayan Aggarwal	Chanthaburi F.C.	Thai League 3	Thailand	2020
Jhayson Singh	All Black FC	Hong Kong Third Division League	Hong Kong	2020–21
Kunal Tamang	Paro FC	Bhutan Premier League	Bhutan	2020–21
Krishan Kumar	New Road Team	Martyr's Memorial A-Division League	Nepal	2020–21
Areeb Abass Mir	SV Bruckmühl	Landesliga Bayern-Süd	Germany	2020–21
Muhammed Nemil Valiyattil	Fundació Esportiva Grama	Tercera División RFEF	Spain	2020–21
Mohammed Inzamam	Al-Hilal United FC	UAE Second Division League	United Arab Emirates	2020–21
Haroon Bashir	Al-Hilal United FC	UAE Second Division League	United Arab Emirates	2020–21
Shubham Rawat	Club Deportivo Llosa	Regional Preferente de la Comunidad Valenciana	Spain	2020–21
Abhimanyu Singh	Club Deportivo Llosa	Regional Preferente de la Comunidad Valenciana	Spain	2020–21
Mehul Verma	Club Deportivo Llosa	Regional Preferente de la Comunidad Valenciana	Spain	2020–21
Mohit Matapurkar	Neckarsulmer SU	Oberliga Baden-Württemberg	Germany	2020–21
Mohammed Nabeeh	Liwa FC Abu Dhabi	UAE Second Division League	United Arab Emirates	2020–21
Ashish Ashutosh	SpVgg Hacklberg	A-Klasse Passau	Germany	2020–21
Mohammad Abdullah	Gulf United FC	UAE Second Division League	United Arab Emirates	2020–21
Soham Bhagawati	Gulf United FC	UAE Second Division League	United Arab Emirates	2020–21
Sudev Parthiban	Nadruvis FC	III Lyga	Lithuania	2020–21
Armaan Kalra	FC Rapperswil-Jona	2. Liga Interregional	Switzerland	2020–21
Souma Das	Collins Edwin FC	Nigeria Nationwide League One of Ikenne	Nigeria	2020–21
Souma Das	Liqui Moly FC	Nigeria Nationwide League Division Two	Nigeria	2021
Dawson Fernandes	Goan United FC	Middlesex County Football League	England	2020–22
Naveen Mendes	Goan United FC	Middlesex County Football League	England	2020–22
Alvito Miranda	Goan United FC	Middlesex County Football League	England	2020–22
Snedden Rodrigues	Goan United FC	Middlesex County Football League	England	2020–22
Elvis Barreto	Goan United FC	Middlesex County Football League	England	2020–22
Lloyd Mascarenhas	Goan United FC	Middlesex County Football League	England	2020–22
Don Fernandes	Goan United FC	Middlesex County Football League	England	2020–22
Alfex D'Souza	Goan United FC	Middlesex County Football League	England	2020–22
Michael Faleiro	Goan United FC	Middlesex County Football League	England	2020–22
Tyson Caiado	Goan United FC	Middlesex County Football League	England	2020–22
Samward Pereira	Goan United FC	Middlesex County Football League	England	2020–22
Treyson Dcosta	Goan United FC	Middlesex County Football League	England	2020–22
Jolan Fernandes	Goan United FC	Middlesex County Football League	England	2020–22
Aliston Fernandes	Goan United FC	Middlesex County Football League	England	2020–22
Alfex Dsouza	Goan United FC	Middlesex County Football League	England	2020–22
Swisfron Fernandes	Goan United FC	Middlesex County Football League	England	2020–22
Sunford Fernandes	Goan United FC	Middlesex County Football League	England	2020–22
Vidipt Dua	Club Deportivo Llosa	Primera Autonómica Preferente	Spain	2020–21
Vidipt Dua	CD Pozo Estrecho Juvenia	Preferente Autonómica de Murcia	Spain	2021–22
Aniket Bharti	Znicz Pruszków	II liga	Poland	2020
Aniket Bharti	Orsomarso Sportivo	Categoría Primera B	Colombia	2022
Shanon Viegas	C.D. Olivais e Moscavide	AF Lisboa 2ª Divisão Série	Portugal	2020–22
Rohit Chandran	Kraków Dragoons FC	Klasa A	Poland	2020–23
Shubham Dixit	Lusos de Bitarães	AF Porto 2ª Divisão	Portugal	2020–21
Shubham Dixit	CRP Delães B	AF Porto 1ª Divisão	Portugal	2022–23
Dhruv Alva	UP Langreo B	Tercera División RFEF	Spain	2020–21
Dhruv Alva	UP Langreo	Segunda División RFEF	Spain	2021–22
Dhruv Alva	UD Llanera	Segunda Federación	Spain	2022–23
Dhruv Alva	Racing Rioja B	Tercera Federación	Spain	2023
Dhruv Alva	CD Berceo	Tercera Federación	Spain	2023–24
Divesh Vinay Jethwani	Elite Falcons FC	UAE Third Division League	United Arab Emirates	2021
Gaurav Pandey	Siam F.C.	Thai League 3	Thailand	2021–22
Shem Marton	Chyasal Youth Club	Martyr's Memorial A-Division League	Nepal	2021
Shem Marton	Three Star Club	Martyr's Memorial A-Division League	Nepal	2021–22
Rahul Ramchandra Yadav	Friends Club Kopundole	Martyr's Memorial A-Division League	Nepal	2021–22
Moinuddin Khan	Himalayan Sherpa Club	Martyr's Memorial A-Division League	Nepal	2021–22
Siddharth Samir Bapodra	UD Benigànim	Regional Preferent Valenciana	Spain	2021–22
Sandesh Jhingan	HNK Šibenik	Croatian First Football League	Croatia	2021–22
Sudipta Malakar	LT Sports Club	Maldivian Third Division	Maldives	2021–22
Hardikpreet Singh	Hong Kong FC	Hong Kong Premier League	Hong Kong	2021–22
Dhruv Vikram Singh	FK Timok Zaječar	Serbian First League	Serbia	2021–22
Nathan Rasquinha	TSV 1957 Sack e.V.	A-Klasse Nürnberg/Frankenhöhe	Germany	2021–22
Vijay Ponnurngam	Chyasal Youth Club	Martyr's Memorial A-Division League	Nepal	2021–22
Gurpreet Singh Chhabal	Brigade Boys Club	Martyr's Memorial A-Division League	Nepal	2021–22
Yuvraj Surinder Bhugra	UD San Sebastián de los Reyes C	Tercera Categoría de Comunidad de Madrid	Spain	2021–22
Ankit Nagar	Billinge FC	Cheshire Association Football League	England	2021–22
Nazir Hussain Sheikh	SF Charlottenburg-Wilmersdorf 03	Landesliga Berlin Staffel 2	Germany	2021
Nazir Hussain Sheikh	Hertha BSC III	Bezirksliga Berlin Staffel 2	Germany	2021–22
André Shashi	Vila Franca do Rosário	AF Lisboa 2ª Divisão	Portugal	2021–23
Sonam Bhutia	Machhindra F.C.	Martyr's Memorial A-Division League	Nepal	2021–23
Bhabindra Malla Thakuri	Everest Club	Chitwan District A-Division League	Nepal	2021–22
Bhabindra Malla Thakuri	Rampur FC	Chitwan District A-Division League	Nepal	2022–23
Nicholas Fernandes	Three Star Club	Martyr's Memorial A-Division League	Nepal	2021
Nicholas Fernandes	Jawalakhel YC	Martyr's Memorial A-Division League	Nepal	2021–22
Nicholas Fernandes	New Road Team	Martyr's Memorial A-Division League	Nepal	2022–23
Zahoor Abbas	SC Horus	Berlin Landesliga	Germany	2021–22
Zahoor Abbas	SFC Stern 1900	Berlin-Liga	Germany	2022–23
Jay Gupta	G.D. Estoril B	AF Lisboa 2ª Divisão	Portugal	2021–23
Jay Gupta	Ebre Escola Esportiva	Tercera Federación	Spain	2023
Kishen Patel	Borussia Pankow 1960	Kreisliga B Berlin	Germany	2022
Neel Swaminathan	FC Viehhausen II	A-Klasse Regensburg	Germany	2022
George Jeremiah	Al Kashaf FC	UAE Fourth Division League	United Arab Emirates	2022–23
Shaunak Pradhan	Al Kashaf FC	UAE Fourth Division League	United Arab Emirates	2022–23
Anandha Krishnan Kurup	Gulf United FC	UAE First Division League	United Arab Emirates	2022–23
Sanwil D'Costa	FC Takin	Bhutan Premier League	Bhutan	2022–23
Anil Gaonkar	FC Takin	Bhutan Premier League	Bhutan	2022–23
Sandip Alay	FC Takin	Bhutan Premier League	Bhutan	2022–23
Srimonta Bhunia	FC Takin	Bhutan Premier League	Bhutan	2022–23
Chandan Das	Samaj Kalyan Khelkud Kendra FC	Martyr's Memorial C-Division League	Nepal	2022–23
Navaldeep Singh	Eastern District SA	Hong Kong First Division League	Hong Kong	2022–23
Ajay Nedel	National Central University FC	Chinese Taipei Football League 3	Chinese Taipei	2022–23
Manjeet Singh	Corinthians HKG	Yee Yee Football League	Hong Kong	2022–23
Ahaan Malkani	Lakeland United FC	United Premier Soccer League	United States	2022–23
Naeem Hifsur Rahman	Admiralty FC	Singapore Football League Div. 2	Singapore	2022–23
Hemen Chheda	GMD 9 Abril Trajouce	AF Lisboa 3ª Divisão	Portugal	2022–23
Suroosh Shahinda	SG Bornheim/GW	Verbandsliga Hessen-Süd	Germany	2022–23
Nitin Meel	Prague Raptors FC	Pražská I. A třída	Czech Republic	2022–23
Mohit Singh Verito	CD Olímpic de Xàtiva	Tercera División	Spain	2022–23
Pranav Thakur	SV Weil 1910	Bezirksliga	Germany	2022–23
Kaustubh Rajendra Shejul	SG Eintracht Peitz II	Kreisliga Niederlausitz	Germany	2022–23
Aayushmaan Chaturvedi	Włodawianka Włodawa	IV liga	Poland	2022
Aayushmaan Chaturvedi	Spółdzielca Siedliszcze	V liga	Poland	2022–23
Aayushmaan Chaturvedi	Grom Kąkolewnica	IV liga	Poland	2023
Anandhu Rajendran Nair	Dunkirk F.C.	United Counties League	England	2022–24
Shubh Kataria	TSV Seebach	Landesliga Bayern	Germany	2022–24
Shamseer Muhammed	Attard Edex Kings FC	Maltese National Amateur League	Malta	2022–23
Shamseer Muhammed	Mdina Knights FC	Maltese National Amateur League	Malta	2023–24
Taran Williams	Reading United AC	USL League Two	United States	2022–23
Taran Williams	Academica SC	USL League Two	United States	2023–24
Taran Williams	Central Valley Fuego FC	USL League One	United States	2024–25
Aidan Rodrigues	Miramar Rangers AFC	Central League	New Zealand	2022–23
Aidan Rodrigues	Petone FC	New Zealand National League	New Zealand	2023–24
Aidan Rodrigues	Waterside Karori	Central League	New Zealand	2025–26
Gagandeep Mewa Singh	Machhindra F.C.	Martyr's Memorial A-Division League	Nepal	2023
Akash Thapa	Kuala Belait FC	Brunei Super League	Brunei	2023–24
Kevisanyü Peseyie	Siam F.C.	Thai League 3	Thailand	2023–24
Anshif Rayan Karikkulukkat	Al-Ethihad FC	UAE Third Division League	United Arab Emirates	2023–24
Muhammad Haris Thitikkottu	Al-Ethihad FC	UAE Third Division League	United Arab Emirates	2023–24
Nandu PalakkpoyiIkayil Madhu	Al-Ethihad FC	UAE Third Division League	United Arab Emirates	2023–24
Neelambar Chamling	Al-Ethihad FC	UAE Third Division League	United Arab Emirates	2023–24
Krrish Sharma	Dubai City FC	UAE Third Division League	United Arab Emirates	2023–24
Rohan Koshy	FC Südstern Karlsruhe	Kreisklasse A2 Karlsruhe	Germany	2023–24
Nikhil Kadam	Lalitpur City F.C.	Nepal Super League	Nepal	2023–24
Priyam Rana	Desportivos do Algueirão	AF Lisboa 3ª Divisão	Portugal	2023–24
Ativeer Jain	Estrela da Amadora C	AF Lisboa 3ª Divisão	Portugal	2023–24
Prashant Uttamchandani	SWA Sharks FC	Provo Premier League	Turks and Caicos Islands	2023–24
Chirag Bawa	Vantaan Jalkapalloseura II	Kolmonen Etelä A	Finland	2023–24
Jainid Ali	Olympique de Cayenne	French Guiana Régional 1	French Guiana	2023–24
Ramesh Kumar Mishra	Põhja-Tallinna JK Volta	Esiliiga B	Estonia	2023–24
Agastya Chetana Uppala	Wilga Garwolin	IV liga	Poland	2023–25
Aydan Haani Nadeer	Al-Nasr	UAE Pro League	United Arab Emirates	2023–25
Smit Vikas Naik	Naprzód Skórzec	V liga	Poland	2023–25
Aaryan Badoni	Gulf United FC	UAE First Division League	United Arab Emirates	2023–24
Aaryan Badoni	Bright Stars FC	Ugandan Super League	Uganda	2024–25
Baoringdao Bodo	Arabian Falcons FC	UAE Third Division League	United Arab Emirates	2024
Jaskaran Singh	North Shore United AFC	NRFL Championship	New Zealand	2024
Mecievi Khieya	Thonburi United F.C.	Thai League 3	Thailand	2024–25
Sushil Shah	Darwin Hearts FC	NorZone Premier League	Australia	2024–25
Sukhwinder Singh	Athletic Club Hombourg	Win4Led League	Belgium	2024–25
Aashir Mohamed Vazhappill⁣⁣	Al-Sailiya SC	Qatari Second Division	Qatar	2024–25
Dharminder Guru	TJ Družstevník Vlčkovce	VIII. liga	Slovakia	2024–25
Vasudev Raman Pillai	D-Gardens United	UAE Second Division League	United Arab Emirates	2024–25
Angad Pandey	D-Gardens United	UAE Second Division League	United Arab Emirates	2024–25
Sachu Siby	Inter Club d'Escaldes	Primera Divisió	Andorra	2024–25
Harmanpreet Singh	Inter Club d'Escaldes	Primera Divisió	Andorra	2024–25
Anandhu Rajendran Nair	Sleaford Town FC	United Counties League	England	2024–25
Reuel Fernandes	Wisła Puławy	II liga	Poland	2025–26
Prasenjit Chakraborty	Arambagh KS	Bangladesh Premier League	Bangladesh	2025–26
Shubhajit Saha	Fakirerpool Young Men's Club	Bangladesh Premier League	Bangladesh	2025–26

=== Present ===
Name	Clubs	Leagues	Countries	Years
Soham Kathuria	Duluth FC	National Premier Soccer League	United States	2017–
Jasminder Dhillon	FC Iliria Solothurn	2. Liga Interregional	Switzerland	2017–
Julius Nelson Raju	TuS Aumühle-Wohltorf	Landesliga Hamburg-Hammonia	Germany	2017–
Kamaljit Singh	SpVgg Vreden	Regionalliga Nord	Germany	2018–
Brian-Narian Fernando	MTV Borstel-Sangenstedt	Kreisliga Lower Saxony	Germany	2018–
Sandip Chandani	Club Esportiu Carroi B	Segona Divisió	Andorra	2019–
Prabin Tsering Bhutia	FC Fürstenried München	Kreisliga 2 München	Germany	2019–
Sajjad Merchant	FC Grand-Saconnex	2. Liga Interregional	Switzerland	2019–
Jasjot Padda	SSV Dillingen 1920 e.V.	Kreisliga Schwaben-West	Germany	2019–
Gabriel Fernandes	Shrivenham F.C.	Hellenic Football League	England	2019–
Sunwinder Singh	SV Eintracht Nordhorn	Bezirksliga Weser-Ems 3	Germany	2019–
Vedaant Nag	USK Anif	Regionalliga Salzburg	Austria	2020–
Amarjeet Mishra	União dos Santos	AF Lisboa 3ª Divisão	Portugal	2020–
Adnan Hiroli	Bridgwater United F.C.	Western Football League	England	2020–
Paramvir Das	DJK Arminia Eilendorf II	Kreisliga B Westfalen	Germany	2020–
Armaan Singh Khangura	Fehérvár FC II	Nemzeti Bajnokság III	Hungary	2021–
Mohammed Arjun	Persiraja Banda Aceh	Liga 2	Indonesia	2021–
Ujjawal Shah	9 Abril Trajouce	AF Lisboa 3ª Divisão	Portugal	2021–
Kavish Juneja	FC Vaguense	AF Aveiro 2ª Divisão South	Portugal	2021–
Areeb Abass Mir	SB/DJK Rosenheim	Landesliga Bayern-Süd	Germany	2021–
Ashiq Vithayathil	CD Fútbol de Tablero	Regionales de Fútbol Canary Islands	Spain	2021–
Amit Kumar	FC Gençlerbirliği Eitorf	Kreisliga B North Rhine-Westphalia	Germany	2021–
Rohit Singh	ASD AC Sorbolo	Campionati Promozione Emilia-Romagna	Italy	2021–
Adarsh Narayanapuram	Olímpic de Xàtiva B	Tercera División RFEF	Spain	2021–
Pawanvir Singh	Happy Valley AA	Hong Kong First Division League	Hong Kong	2021–
Jhayson Singh	Happy Valley AA	Hong Kong First Division League	Hong Kong	2021–
Sanjay Sathyan	Adlershofer BC 1908 e.V.	Landesliga Berlin Staffel 2	Germany	2021–
Hasan Alam	CF Unión Viera	Tercera División RFEF	Spain	2021–
Bhavya Patel	JSC Blau-Weiss Aachen II	Kreisliga C Rhineland	Germany	2021–
Shubham Rawat	CD Olímpic de Xàtiva	Tercera División RFEF	Spain	2021–
Prajwal Dey	SC Stetternich	Kreisliga C Westfalen	Germany	2021–
Arjun Anand Hingne	Cimiano Calcio	Terza Categoria	Italy	2021–
Atharv Dandekar	CF Unión Viera	Tercera División RFEF	Spain	2021–
Raghav Maheshwaran	Sporting Martinus	Vierde Klasse	Netherlands	2021–
Mohit Matapurkar	I. SC Göttingen 05	Landesliga Braunschweig	Germany	2021–
Soham Bhagawati	U. E. Torroella	Tercera Catalana	Spain	2021–
Vansh Shrisvastava	União Desportiva Algés	AF Lisboa 2° Divisão	Portugal	2021–
Mohamed Niyas Muliyathil	Regional Sports FC	UAE Second Division League	United Arab Emirates	2021–
Sharib Khan	FC Jõgeva Wolves	III liiga lõuna	Estonia	2021–
Nameer Naushad Mulani	ADC Sosense	AF Aveiro 2ª Divisão	Portugal	2021–
Dhiraj Rajmukhi	Kowloon Knights	Hong Kong Second Division League	Hong Kong	2021–
Raj Heera	Kowloon Knights	Hong Kong Second Division League	Hong Kong	2021–
Nikhil Narwani	Kowloon Knights	Hong Kong Second Division League	Hong Kong	2021–
Nikhil Jhuremalani	Kowloon Knights	Hong Kong Second Division League	Hong Kong	2021–
Harsahib Singh Gill	Southern District FC	Hong Kong Premier League	Hong Kong	2021–
Aman Khanna	FC London	League1 Ontario	Canada	2022–
Aswin Gimber	SV Newroz Hildesheim	Landesliga Hannover	Germany	2022–
Taljinder Singh	A.S.D. Todi	Promozione	Italy	2022–
Arpan Singh Brar	ACRD Lusos de Bitarães	FA Porto 2ª Divisão	Portugal	2022–
Kabir Baruah Nath	Villajoyosa CF	Tercera División RFEF	Spain	2022–
Jagroop Singh	Hertha BSC III	Bezirksliga Berlin	Germany	2022–
Xavier Pius	Gel-Sar United FC	Bhutan Dzongkhag League	Bhutan	2022–
Prajil Kumar Jr.	Gel-Sar United FC	Bhutan Dzongkhag League	Bhutan	2022–
Deepak Sharma	Wong Tai Sin DRSC	Hong Kong First Division League	Hong Kong	2022–
Karthik Thulasi	Rayo Vallecano de Madrid C	Primera Categoría de Aficionados	Spain	2022–
Harleen Singh	Fußballverein Illertissen II	Landesliga Bayern-Südwest	Germany	2022–
Hardikpreet Singh	Southern District FC	Hong Kong Premier League	Hong Kong	2022–
Shaliyanth Modugula Reddy	Sportverein Raiffeisen Kuchl	Fußball-Regionalliga Österreich	Austria	2022–
Mohammad-Mostafa Nawazy	NSC Marathon 02	Landesliga Berlin Staffel 1	Germany	2022–
Vishal Yadav	JSC Blau-Weiss Aachen I	Kreisliga C Westfalen	Germany	2022–
Shravan Kumar	FSG Altenstadt 1912 II	Kreisliga B Büdingen	Germany	2022–
Aryan Khokhar	CD Olímpic de Xàtiva	Tercera División RFEF	Spain	2022–
Spandan Sharma	SG Union 1919 Klosterfelde	Brandenburg-Liga	Germany	2022–
Aakash Dave	Transport United FC	Bhutan Premier League	Bhutan	2022–
Anrit Bhatt	1. FC Ersingen	Fußball-Landesliga Baden	Germany	2022–
Benedict Bebetto	Transport United FC	Bhutan Premier League	Bhutan	2022–
Siddhant Sharma	NSC Marathon 02	Landesliga Berlin Staffel 1	Germany	2022–
Abhishek Rana	SpVgg Grün-Weiss Deggendorf II	A-Klasse Deggendorf Niederbayern Ost	Germany	2022–
Ashwin Phatak	SV Weiden 1914/75	Kreisliga A Rhein-Erft	Germany	2022–
Nazir Hussain Sheikh	SC Lankwitz Berlin	Kreisliga Berlin A	Germany	2022–
Pandia Rajan Sivaprahasan	Valadares Gaia FC	Campeonato de Portugal	Portugal	2022–
Zehd Ahmed Mubin	Al Nujoom FC	UAE Third Division League	United Arab Emirates	2022–
Brian Damian Ellens	Valadares Gaia FC	Campeonato de Portugal	Portugal	2022–
Nathan Rasquinha	SG Nürnberg-Fürth	Kreisliga Bavaria	Germany	2022–
Armaan Kalra	FC Weesen	Swiss 1. Liga	Switzerland	2022–
Yuvraj Surinder Bhugra	C.D. Unión el Parque	Tercera Categoría de Aficionados de Madrid	Spain	2022–
Akashdeep Singh	ACD Vigolo Marchese	Serie D – Girone D	Italy	2022–
Arun Aujla	Billinge FC	Cheshire Association Football League	England	2022–
Hamza Abdul Nazar	Al-Hilal United FC	UAE Second Division League	United Arab Emirates	2022–
Fahim Faisal	D-Gardens United	UAE Third Division League	United Arab Emirates	2022–
Dilshat Singh	Kowloon Knights	Hong Kong Second Division League	Hong Kong	2022–
Amit Suraj Melwani	Kowloon Knights	Hong Kong Second Division League	Hong Kong	2022–
Sidhanth Das	ADCF Santo André	AF Aveiro 2ª Divisão	Portugal	2022–
Kulbir Singh	Allied Colloids FC	Yau Yee Football League	Hong Kong	2023–
Abhishek Verma	FC Khumaltar	Martyr's Memorial A-Division League	Nepal	2023–
Vinay Singh	FC Mönchhof	II. Liga Nord Burgenland	Austria	2023–
Chandan Das	Sankata Boys S.C.	Martyr's Memorial A-Division League	Nepal	2023–
Navaldeep Singh	Leaper Metro Gallery	Hong Kong First Division League	Hong Kong	2023–
Sreenath Raghunathan	FC International Magdeburg	4. Kreisklasse Saxony	Germany	2023–
Jithu Varghese	FC International Magdeburg	4. Kreisklasse Saxony	Germany	2023–
Amal Kalikot Jayaraj	FC International Magdeburg	4. Kreisklasse Saxony	Germany	2023–
Adithya Ajeet	FC International Magdeburg	4. Kreisklasse Saxony	Germany	2023–
Visakh Padmanabhan	FC International Magdeburg	4. Kreisklasse Saxony	Germany	2023–
Vinuprasad Vemanattu Muralledharan	FC International Magdeburg	4. Kreisklasse Saxony	Germany	2023–
Saivish Singh	New Road Team	Martyr's Memorial A-Division League	Nepal	2023–
Lalnunzama Kolney	New Road Team	Martyr's Memorial A-Division League	Nepal	2023–
Gaurav Pandey	Samut Sakhon United	Thai League 3	Thailand	2023–
Sanwil D'Costa	FC Khumaltar	Martyr's Memorial A-Division League	Nepal	2023–
Yash Mhatre	Manang Marshyangdi Club	Martyr's Memorial A-Division League	Nepal	2023–
Satyam Sharma	Himalayan Sherpa Club	Martyr's Memorial A-Division League	Nepal	2023–
Rahul Khokhar	Jawalakhel YC	Martyr's Memorial A-Division League	Nepal	2023–
Sandip Alay	Sankata Boys S.C.	Martyr's Memorial A-Division League	Nepal	2023–
Gagandeep Mewa Singh	Church Boys United	Martyr's Memorial A-Division League	Nepal	2023–
Ranjeet Pandre	Church Boys United	Martyr's Memorial A-Division League	Nepal	2023–
Saptak Pal	Miðvágs Bóltfelag	3. deild	Faroe Islands	2023–
Muhammed Ashiq Shoukathali	Nepal Police Club	Martyr's Memorial A-Division League	Nepal	2023–
Jeevesh Harikumar	Tanjong Pagar United FC	Singapore Premier League	Singapore	2023–
Nathan Gray	Charlotte Independence	USL League One	United States	2023–
Nimit Agarwal	Salzburger AK 1914	Regionalliga Salzburg	Austria	2023–
Aniket Bharti	Independiente Santa Fe	Categoría Primera A	Colombia	2023–
Rohith Rajan Pillai	TSV Eschach	Landesliga Bodensee	Germany	2023–
Bijay Chhetri	Colón F.C.	Uruguayan Segunda División	Uruguay	2024–
Tahsin Mohammed Jamshid	Al-Duhail SC	Qatar Stars League	Qatar	2024–
Som Kumar	NK Radomlje	Slovenian PrvaLiga	Slovenia	2025–

== Senior women ==
As of 2 September 2026

=== Past ===
Name	Clubs	Leagues	Countries	Years
Disha Malhotra	AFD Grifo Perugia	Serie A2 calcio femminile	Italy	2009–10
Tanvie Hans	Tottenham Hotspur WFC	FA Women's Super League	England	2013–15
Tanvie Hans	Fulham LFC	London and South East Women's Regional Football League	England	2015
Bembem Devi Oinam	New Radiant WSC	FAM Women's Football Championship	Maldives	2014–15
Lako Phuti Bhutia	New Radiant WSC	FAM Women's Football Championship	Maldives	2014–15
Lako Phuti Bhutia	Sunrise WSC	Bhutan Women's National Championship	Bhutan	2018–19
Bala Devi Ngangom	New Radiant W.S.C.	FAM Women's Football Championship	Maldives	2015
Bala Devi Ngangom	Rangers W.F.C.	Scottish Women's Premier League	Scotland	2020–21
Ashalata Devi Loitongbam	New Radiant W.S.C.	FAM Women's Football Championship	Maldives	2015
Aditi Chauhan	West Ham United W.F.C.	FA Women's Super League	England	2015–18
Aditi Chauhan	Hamar Hveragerði	2. deild kvenna	Iceland	2021
Durva Vahia	Exeter City Women F.C.	FA Women's National League Division 1 South West	England	2016–17
Nimita Gurung	Sunrise W.F.C.	Bhutan Women's National Championship	Bhutan	2018–19
Nim Riki Sherpa	Sunrise W.F.C.	Bhutan Women's National Championship	Bhutan	2018–19
Aita Hangma Limboo	Sunrise W.F.C.	Bhutan Women's National Championship	Bhutan	2018–19
Brishti Bagchi	CDC Moscardó W.F.C.	Primera Nacional de Fútbol	Spain	2019–21
Brishti Bagchi	AD Colmenar Viejo	Primera Nacional de Fútbol	Spain	2021–22
Brishti Bagchi	Torrelodones CF	Primera Nacional de Fútbol	Spain	2023–24
Dalima Chhibber	Manitoba Bisons	Canada West Universities Premier Division	Canada	2019–21, 2022–23
Vinaya Seshan	Paris Université Club	Régional 1 Féminine	France	2021–22
Vinaya Seshan	CA Paris 14	Régional 1 Féminine	France	2023–24
Purnima Kumari	Biratnagar Metropolitan City WFC	National Women's League	Nepal	2021–22
Dipshikha Biswakarma	Chaudandigarhi Municipality of Udaipur WFC	National Women's League	Nepal	2021–22
Aimit Lepcha	Chaudandigarhi Municipality of Udaipur WFC	National Women's League	Nepal	2021–22
Angela Bhutia	Chaudandigarhi Municipality of Udaipur WFC	National Women's League	Nepal	2021–22
Sujata Rai	Chaudandigarhi Municipality of Udaipur WFC	National Women's League	Nepal	2021–22
Grace Dangmei	Sevinch Qarshi	Uzbekistan Women's League	Uzbekistan	2022–23
Soumya Guguloth	ŽNK Dinamo Zagreb	Prva hrvatska nogometna liga za žene	Croatia	2022–23
Aveka Singh	Fundació Terrassa FC	Segunda Federación	Spain	2022–23
Jyoti Chouhan	ŽNK Dinamo Zagreb	Prva hrvatska nogometna liga za žene	Croatia	2022–24
Malavika Hemanth	Aerion WFC	Women's Premier League	Singapore	2022–24
Manisha Kalyan	Apollon Limassol L.F.C.	Cypriot First Division	Cyprus	2022–24
Manisha Kalyan	PAOK	Greek A Division	Greece	2024–26
Manisha Kalyan	Alianza Lima	Primera División Femenina	Peru	2026
M. K. Kashmina	ŽNK Dinamo Zagreb	Prva hrvatska nogometna liga za žene	Croatia	2023–24
Kiran Pisda	ŽNK Dinamo Zagreb	Prva hrvatska nogometna liga za žene	Croatia	2023–24
Prachi Kumar	Lil Soldiers FC	AFL Women's League	Anguilla	2023–24
Diti Kanungo	Bristol & West Ladies	Gloucestershire County Women's Football League	England	2023–24
Gayathri Manohar⁣	Banaat	UAE Women's Football League	United Arab Emirates	2023–24
Buli Sarkar	Koshi WFC	National Women's League	Nepal	2024–25
Sunita Sarkar	Koshi WFC	National Women's League	Nepal	2024–25
Tamalika Sarkar	Koshi WFC	National Women's League	Nepal	2024–25
Sujata Rai	Bagmati Youth Club	National Women's League	Nepal	2024–25
Panthoi Chanu Elangbam	Metro United WFC	National Premier Leagues Women's	Australia	2024
Anaya Sehgal	Tampines Rovers WFC	Women's Premier League	Singapore	2024–25
Anaya Sehgal	Lion City Sailors WFC	Women's Premier League	Singapore	2025–26
Misha Bhandari	Precision FC	UAE Women's Football League	United Arab Emirates	2024–25
Harshika Jain	Atletic Olimpia Gherla	Liga I	Romania	2025
Anjana Thapa	Transport United	Bhutan Women's National League	Bhutan	2025
Jeewanti Bisht	Transport United	Bhutan Women's National League	Bhutan	2025
Rivka Ramji	Lion City Sailors WFC	AFC Women's Champions League	Singapore	2025
Kajol D'Souza	Al-Amal SC	Saudi Women's First Division League	Saudi Arabia	2025–26

=== Present ===
Name	Club	League	Country	Years
Aveka Singh	Næstved HG	Danish Women's 1st Division	Denmark	2025–
Anaya Sehgal	Albirex Jurong	Women's Premier League	Singapore	2026–
Manisha Kalyan	AEK Athens	Greek A Division	Greece	2026–
Jyoti Chouhan	Bnot Netanya	Ligat Nashim First Division	Israel	2026–
Ruchi Yadav	Nashama Al-Mustaqbal	Jordan Women's Pro League	Jordan	2026–

== Youth men ==
As of 13 September 2023

Name	Clubs	Leagues	Countries	Years
Darren Caldeira	Valencia CF U19	División de Honor Juvenil de Fútbol	Spain	2005
Sean Andrady	McKendree Bearcats	NAIA American Midwest Conference	United States	2007–10
Adnan Hiroli	Bristol Rovers Youth	Football League Youth Alliance	England	2007–08
Adnan Hiroli	Brislington F.C. Youth	Avon Youth League	England	2008–09
Adnan Hiroli	Cardiff Corinthians F.C.	South Wales Alliance League	Wales	2009–10
Ram Ram	CCD Vale Milhaços (youth)	AF Setúbal 3ª Divisão	Portugal	2008–10
Ram Ram	Charneca Caparica	AF Setúbal Jun. A 1ª Divisão	Portugal	2010–11
Sunny Dhaliwal	Brampton East SC U10	Ontario Soccer League	Canada	2009–11
Sunny Dhaliwal	Westbridge SC	Vancouver Metro Soccer League	Canada	2011–14
Sunny Dhaliwal	North Miss SC	Vancouver Metro Soccer League	Canada	2014–15
Sunny Dhaliwal	Toronto FC Academy	MLS Next	Canada United States	2016–18
Sunny Dhaliwal	George Mason Patriots	NCAA Division I	United States	2020–
Brandon Fernandes	ASD Cape Town (youth)	SAFA Regional League	South Africa	2010–13
Myron Mendes	ASD Cape Town (youth)	SAFA Regional League	South Africa	2010–13
Avyay Gujral	R.S.C. Anderlecht U19	Belgian Youth Football League	Belgium	2010–11
Avyay Gujral	St. Francis Brooklyn Terriers	NCAA Division I Northeast Conference	United States	2012–13
Kean Lewis	Fairleigh Dickinson Knights	NCAA Division I	United States	2010–13
Kean Lewis	Houston Dynamo U23	Major League Soccer	United States	2014–15
Namit Deshpande	Bethseda SC Maryland	Super Y League Mid-Atlantic Division	United States	2010–14
Namit Deshpande	FC Delco	Super Y League Mid-Atlantic Division	United States	2014–17
Aswin Gimber	VfV Borussia 06 Hildesheim U19	3. Bezirksliga North Rhine-Westphalia	Germany	2011–12
Adit Rastogi	Vicenza Calcio	Campionato Nazionale Juniores	Italy	2011–12
Adit Rastogi	Parma Calcio 1913 Youth	Campionato Nazionale Juniores	Italy	2013
Kilp Barfungpa	Eintracht Dortmund U19	Bezirksliga	Germany	2012–13
Aayushmaan Chaturvedi	Brooke House College FA	ECFA Premier League	England	2012–14
Siddharth Singh	Nottingham Trent University (Football)	LIGA A – Victoria Embankment	England	2012–14
Sahal Abdul Samad	Al-Ittihad Sports Academy	UAE Youth League	United Arab Emirates	2012–16
Abneet Bharti	Geylang International	Singapore National Football League	Singapore	2012–13
Abneet Bharti	Balestier Khalsa	Singapore Premier League	Singapore	2013–14
Abneet Bharti	Real Valladolid U19	Primera División RFEF	Spain	2014–15
Aldrich Coelho	ASD Cape Town (youth)	SAFA Regional League	South Africa	2013
Amarjit Singh	ASD Cape Town (youth)	SAFA Regional League	South Africa	2013–14
Uttam Rai	Flatirons Rush SC	USL League Two	United States	2013–14
Tarun Ludhwani	Colorado Rush B	USL League Two	United States	2013–14
Tarun Ludhwani	AD Oeiras (youth)	Nacional Jun.B 2ª Fase Manutenção	Portugal	2015–16
Tarun Ludhwani	SG Sacavenense (youth)	Nacional 2ª Divisão Jun.A	Portugal	2016–17
Ishan Pandita	Alcobendas CF Youth	Primera Regional de Fútbol	Spain	2014–15
Ishan Pandita	UD Almería U18	Tercera División RFEF	Spain	2015–16
Ishan Pandita	CD Leganés U19	Tercera División RFEF	Spain	2016–19
Princeton Rebello	Queens Park Rangers	Professional Development League	England	2014
Shiv Pratap Singh Ranawat	Fundación Marcet U19	Liga Nacional Juvenil de Fútbol	Spain	2014–15
Vishant Gianchandani	Union Sportive Sandweiler U19	Luxembourg U19 Junior Championship	Luxembourg	2014–15
Abhinav Mulagada	Senrab F.C.	Sunday league football	England	2014–15
Abhinav Mulagada	Leyton Orient FC U16	Football League Youth Alliance	England	2015–16
Jasjot Padda	FC Augsburg II	U-17 Landesliga Bayern-Süd	Germany	2014–15
Jasjot Padda	FC 1920 Gundelfingen U19	U-19 Landesliga Bayern-Süd	Germany	2016–18
Prashant Choudhary	Fundación Marcet	Liga Nacional Juvenil de Fútbol	Spain	2014–15
Prashant Choudhary	Centro Europo de Tecnofutbol	Liga Nacional Juvenil de Fútbol	Spain	2015–17
Prashant Choudhary	Celaya FC U19	Liga de Expansión MX	Mexico	2019
Aniket Bharti	Balestier Khalsa FC (youth)	Centre of Excellence Developmental League	Singapore	2014–15
Aniket Bharti	Lechia Gdańsk Youth	Centralna Liga Juniorów	Poland	2015–16
Aniket Bharti	Znicz Pruszków U19	Centralna Liga Juniorów	Poland	2016–20
Franko Paul	DFI Bad Aibling e.V.	U19 Regionalliga West	Germany	2015–16
Aameen Goyal	Greensboro Pride	USA South Athletic Conference	United States	2015–16
Jasminder Dhillon	FC Solothurn II	3. Liga Interregional	Switzerland	2015–17
Karan Padmakumar	Methodist Monarchs	NCAA Division III USA South Athletic Conference	United States	2015–18
Ashique Kuruniyan	Villarreal CF C	Tercera División RFEF	Spain	2016–17
Deependra Negi	CF Reus Deportiu	Tercera División RFEF	Spain	2016–17
Varun Mathur	TuS Bad Aibling II	Bezirksliga Bavaria	Germany	2016–17
Varun Mathur	Sportbund DJK Rosenheim	Landesliga Bayern-Südost	Germany	2017
Soham Kathuria	Montevallo Falcons	NCAA Division II	United States	2016–17
Soham Kathuria	SUNY Oneonta Red Dragons	NCAA Division III	United States	2017–18
Ashiq Vithayathil	FC Malaga City Academy	División de Honor Juvenil de Fútbol	Spain	2016–17
Ashiq Vithayathil	AS Tevere Roma	Eccellenza Lazio	Italy	2017–18
Pawanvir Singh	Sai Kung Friends Reserves	Hong Kong Third Division League	Hong Kong	2017–18
Atharv Dandekar	Marcet Escuela de Fútbol B	Divisiones Regionales de Fútbol	Spain	2017–18
Aryan Gupta	AD Alcorcón U19	División de Honor Juvenil de Fútbol	Spain	2017–18
Aryan Gupta	UB Conquense B	Primera Autonómica Preferente Castilla-La Mancha	Spain	2018–19
Zayed bin Waleed	Dubai LaLiga HPC U18	Dubai Youth Football League	United Arab Emirates	2017–19
Kabir Nath	Cambrils Unió CF U17	Liga Nacional Juvenil de Fútbol	Spain	2017–19
Amarjeet Mishra	1º Dezembro U19	Campeonato de Portugal	Portugal	2017–19
Amarjeet Mishra	C.F. Estrela da Amadora U19	Campeonato Nacional de Juniores	Portugal	2019
Faizi Salim	UMFK Bengals	USCAA National Championship	United States	2018
Akul Bhatia	Methodist Monarchs	NCAA Division III USA South Athletic Conference	United States	2018
Rudra Ved	Atlético Saguntino (U19)	Comunidad Valenciana Preferente U19	Spain	2018–19
Brian Damian Ellens	S.C. Alba U19	AF Aveiro 1ª Divisão	Portugal	2018–19
Luv Kapoor	Palamós CF	Tercera División RFEF	Spain	2018–19
Bhupender Singh	CD Olímpic de Xàtiva U19	Regional Preferente	Spain	2018–19
Kelsang Lungkara	George Brown Huskies	Ontario Colleges Athletic Association Conference	Canada	2018–19
Aaryan Saroha	CD Zafranar (youth)	Divisiones Regionales de Fútbol Jounioren (Valencia)	Spain	2018–19
Jhayson Singh	Southern District FC (Reserves)	Hong Kong First Division League	Hong Kong	2018–20
Armaan Kalra	Grasshopper Club Zürich (U19 & U21)	2. Liga Schweiz	Switzerland	2018–20
Adarsh Puthupallil	CD Olímpic de Xàtiva (youth)	Tercera División	Spain	2018–21
Akashdeep Singh	Carpi F.C. 1909 U17	Campionato Primavera 3	Italy	2018–19
Akashdeep Singh	Carpi F.C. 1909 U19	Promozione	Italy	2019–21
Sharv Ghadge	Islands District FC (youth)	Hong Kong Third Division League	Hong Kong	2018
Sharv Ghadge	Hong Kong FC Colts	Hong Kong Elite Youth League	Hong Kong	2018–22
Bilal Shamsuddeen	Gulf United FC U18	Dubai Youth League U19	United Arab Emirates	2018–20
Bilal Shamsuddeen	PIMA Aztecs	NJCAA Division II Soccer	United States	2020–
Sarangapany Pagadala	Monroe Mustangs	National Junior College Athletic Association	United States	2019
Muhammed Nemil	Fundación Marcet	Segona Catalana	Spain	2019
Muhammed Nemil	UDA Gramenet U19	Segona Catalana	Spain	2020–21
Dhruv Alva	UP Langreo U19	Tercera División RFEF	Spain	2019–20
Arvin Shaju	Cambrian Golden Shield	Ontario Colleges Athletic Association	Canada	2019–20
Jay Gupta	GDS Cascais U19	AF Lisboa Jun. 1ª Divisão	Portugal	2019–20
Muhammad Quraish	Olímpic de Xàtiva U19	Regional Preferente	Spain	2019–21
Shlok Kaul	Étoile Carouge FC Youth	Swiss U17 Elite League	Switzerland	2019–21
Shlok Kaul	Servette FC M-17	Swiss U17 Elite League	Switzerland	2021–22
Mohammad Abdullah Khan	Gulf United FC U18	Dubai Youth League U19	United Arab Emirates	2019–21
Mohammad Abdullah Khan	Wilmington Wildcats	NCAA Division II Central Atlantic Collegiate Conference	United States	2021–23
Ansh Budhwar	Hartwick Hawks	NCAA Division III Empire 8	United States	2019–23
Stephen Sam	Emmaus Eagles	NCCAA Division II Midwest Christian College Conference	United States	2019–23
Priyam Rana	Sintrense U17	Nacional Jun.B 2ª Divisão	Portugal	2019–20
Priyam Rana	RD Algueirão U19	AF Lisbon Jun.A 2D	Portugal	2021–22
Priyam Rana	Mem Martins SC U19	AF Lisbon Jun.A 2D	Portugal	2022–23
Yuvraj Bakshi	Lakehead Thunderwolves	Ontario University Athletics	Canada	2019–
Daksh Gupta	Crawley Town FC U19	SCL Youth Development League	England	2019–20
Daksh Gupta	Menlo Oaks	NAIA Golden State Athletic Conference	United States	2021–23
Karthik Thulasi	CD Leganés B	Segunda Federación	Spain	2020
Aman Manghi	Hofstra Pride	NCAA Division I Colonial Athletic Association	United States	2020
Hardikpreet Singh	Southern District FC Reserves	Hong Kong First Division League	Hong Kong	2020–21
Rohit Singh	Scheda Lentigione Calcio U19	Campionato Nazionale Juniores	Italy	2020–21
Som Kumar	NK Bravo U17, U19	Slovenian Junior League	Slovenia	2020–21, 2022
Som Kumar	NK Krka U17, U19	Slovenian Junior League	Slovenia	2021–22, 2022–23
Som Kumar	NK Olimpija Ljubljana U19	Slovenian Junior League	Slovenia	2023–
Shalom Fernandes	Gulf United FC U18	Dubai Youth League U19	United Arab Emirates	2020–
Kumayle Merchant	Randolph Wildcats	NCAA Division III Old Dominion Athletic Conference	United States	2020–
Arnav Rai	Hong Kong FC Colts	Hong Kong Elite Youth League	Hong Kong	2020–
Gautam Gawlani	Palamós CF U19	Tercera Catalana	Spain	2020–21
Ahaan Malkani	Muskegon Jayhawks	NJCAA Division II Soccer	United States	2020–21
Ahaan Malkani	SCC Blackhawks	NJCAA Division II Soccer	United States	2021–22
Armaan Singh Sandhu	S.L. Benfica (youth)	Nacional Jun.C 2ª Divisão	Portugal	2020–
Vijay Singh	Palamós CF Juveníl	Tercera Catalana	Spain	2021–22
Adi Joshi	Palamós CF U16	Quarta Catalana	Spain	2021–22
Bhagyaraj Tanwani	Global Palamós CF U20	Juvenil Segona Divisió	Spain	2021–22
Naser Sayed	Charleston Golden Eagles	NCAA Division II Mountain East Conference	United States	2021–22
Shameek Caine Vas	Fundación Marcet	Liga Nacional Juvenil de Fútbol	Spain	2021–22
Pranav Pillai	Fundacio Esportiva Palamós	Liga Nacional Juvenil de Fútbol	Spain	2021–22
Mohammed Hani Shaik	St. Mary's Rattlers	NCAA Division III Soccer	United States	2021–22
Nathan Gray	Atlanta United Youth	MLS Next	United States	2021–23
Jatin Pal	Rio Maior SC U15	AF Santarém Jun.C 2ª Divisão	Portugal	2021–
Sriram Chidambaram	Webster Gorloks	NCAA Division III St. Louis Intercollegiate Athletic Conference	United States	2021–
Lokanshu Malur	Erskine Flying Fleet	NCAA Division II Conference Carolinas	United States	2021–
Ayaan John	Goshen Maple Leafs	NAIA Crossroads League	United States	2021–
Tejas Raja Setlur	Pratt Institute Cannoneers	NCAA Division III Coast to Coast Athletic Conference	United States	2021–
Vedant Sharma	Pratt Institute Cannoneers	NCAA Division III Coast to Coast Athletic Conference	United States	2021–
Arjun Sharin	Eastern Eagles	NCAA Division III Middle Atlantic Conferences	United States	2021–
Samyak Srikant	Eastern Eagles	NCAA Division III Middle Atlantic Conferences	United States	2021–
Raghauv Taneja	Menlo Oaks	NAIA Golden State Athletic Conference	United States	2021–
Pratham Mamtora	Notre Dame Falcons	NCAA Division II Mountain East Conference	United States	2021–
Elim Thomas	Gordon Fighting Scots	NCAA Division III Commonwealth Coast Conference	United States	2021–
Agastya Dharamarj	Buffalo State Bengals	NCAA Division III State University of New York Athletic Conference	United States	2021–
Yuveer Kelkar	West Virginia Wesleyan Bobcats	NCAA Division II Mountain East Conference	United States	2021–
Aman Manghi	Geneseo Knights	NCAA Division III State University of New York Athletic Conference	United States	2021–
Karthik Shashikanth	Af Col. Atlântico (youth)	AF Setúbal Jun.E Divisão	Portugal	2021–
Kabir Shashikanth	Af Col. Atlântico (youth)	AF Setúbal Jun.E Divisão	Portugal	2021–
Amanjyot Singh	Mohawk Mountaineers	Ontario Colleges Athletic Association	Canada	2021–22
Kartik Nayyar	Campbellsville Tigers	NAIA Mid-South Conference Soccer Championship	United States	2021–22
Rahul Harshana	Lakeland Rustlers	Alberta Colleges Athletics Conference	Canada	2021–22
Sukhman Singh	UNBC Timberwolves	Canada West Athletic Association Conference	Canada	2021–22
Ayaan Shabbir Yusuf	Al Wasl FC U19	UAE Youth League	United Arab Emirates	2021–22
Ayaan Shabbir Yusuf	Shabab Al Ahli U21	UAE U21 Youth League	United Arab Emirates	2022–
Gurjot Singh Tarad	CD Praia Milfontes U15	AF Beja Jun.C 1D	Portugal	2022–23
Saksham Shrivastava	Global Palamós CF U20	Juvenil Segona Divisió	Spain	2022–23
Aaryaan Mishra	G.D. Gafanha U15	Nacional Juniores C Manutenção	Portugal	2022–23
Nigel Kunnan	Lion City Sailors (youth)	Centre of Excellence U19 Developmental League	Singapore	2022–23
Dhruv Bafna	Lion City Sailors (youth)	Centre of Excellence U19 Developmental League	Singapore	2022–23
Aaditya Rao	Lion City Sailors (youth)	Centre of Excellence U19 Developmental League	Singapore	2022–23
Mohammad Sajid	Emory and Henry Wasps	NCAA Division II South Atlantic Conference	United States	2022–23
Kunphel Sinha	Framingham State Rams	NCAA Division III Massachusetts State Collegiate Athletic Conference	United States	2022–23
Aman Khatkar	Sault Cougars	CCAA Men's Soccer National Championship	Canada	2022–23
Sash Bala	Judson Eagles	NAIA Men's Soccer Championship	United States	2022–23
Rahul Kwatra	Gannon Golden Knights	NCAA Division II Men's Soccer Championship	United States	2022–23
Anish Dahiya	CBU Capers	Atlantic University Sport	Canada	2022–23
Jatin Sharma	Lambton Lions	Ontario Colleges Athletic Association	Canada	2022–23
Aman Khanna	Western Mustangs	Ontario University Athletics	Canada	2022–23
Arnav Rishi	Elmira Soaring Eagles	NCAA Division III Empire 8	United States	2022–23
Arnav Tamang	Albion Britons	NCAA Division III Michigan Intercollegiate Athletic Association	United States	2022–23
Shreyas Swamy	Mercyhurst Lakers	NCAA Division II Pennsylvania State Athletic Conference	United States	2022–23
Jai Sama	Drew Rangers	NCAA Division III Landmark Conference	United States	2022–23
Uday Agarwal	Dallas Crusaders	NCAA Division III Southern Collegiate Athletic Conference	United States	2022–23
Abdul Qayyum	GSU Jaguars	NAIA Chicagoland Collegiate Athletic Conference	United States	2022–23
Naytik Vora	Curry Colonels	NCAA Division III Commonwealth Coast Conference	United States	2022–23
Abhishek Kevadiya	DFI Bad Aibling U19	U19 BOL 1 Oberbayern Jugend	Germany	2022–23
Atharv Airen	DePauw Tigers	NCAA Division III North Coast Athletic Conference	United States	2022–23
Parth Raval	Penn State Nittany Lions	NCAA Division III Allegheny Mountain Collegiate Conference	United States	2022–23
Joshua Sabu	Crandall Chargers	Atlantic Collegiate Athletic Association	Canada	2022–23
Abi Babgy	Crandall Chargers	Atlantic Collegiate Athletic Association	Canada	2022–23
Faaiz Muhammed Asif	Assiniboine Cougars	Manitoba Colleges Athletic Conference	Canada	2022–23
Kabir Sethi	S.C. Canidelo (youth)	AF Porto 1ª Divisão	Portugal	2022–23
Vikramjeet Singh	C.F. Santa Iria (youth)	AF Lisboa Jun.B Honra	Portugal	2022–23
Kartik Nayyar	Douglas Royals	Pacific Western Athletic Association	Canada	2022–23
Mohamed Hateem Ali⁣⁣	Shabab Al Ahli U17	UAE Youth League	United Arab Emirates	2022–24
Arya Chaitanya	II Kerulet UFC U19Vasad RSC	Magyar Labdarúgó Szövetség	Hungary	2024–26
Mohammad Razin	Al-Nassr FC U14	Saudi U-15 Premier League	Saudi Arabia	2024–25
Nihaar Manirama	ND Slovan U19	2. Mladinska liga	Slovenia	2024–25

== Youth women ==
As of 11 November 2025

Name	Clubs	Leagues	Countries	Years
Disha Malhotra	Mississippi College Choctaws	NCAA Division III American Southwest Conference	United States	2010–12
Aditi Chauhan	Loughborough University W.F.C.	United Counties League	England	2013–15
Jyoti Ann Burrett	University of Exeter Ladies F.C.	BUCS Football League	England	2014
Durva Vahia	NYIT Bears	NCAA Division II	United States	2011–12
Durva Vahia	University of Exeter Ladies F.C.	Devon Women's Football League	England	2014–17
Brishti Bagchi	Oklahoma City University Women's Soccer	NCAA Division I Women's Soccer Championship	United States	2013–15
Brishti Bagchi	University of North Texas Women's	NCAA Division I Women's Soccer Championship	United States	2015–17
Reva Sankhe	Wellesley Blue	NCAA Division III New England Athletic Conference	United States	2019–23
Aveka Singh	UC Irvine Anteaters	Big West Conference	United States	2020–24
Aarti Singh	Foresters	NCAA Division III Midwest Conference	United States	2020–21
Siya Kasat	Prairie Fire Knox	NCAA Division III Midwest Conference	United States	2020–21
Misha Bhandari	Go-Pro Sports Academy WFC	Dubai Youth Women's League	United Arab Emirates	2020–21
Gia Sundaram	Grinnell Pioneers	NCAA Division III Midwest Conference	United States	2021–24
Mahima Patil	George Brown Huskies	Ontario Colleges Athletic Association	Canada	2021–22
Arundhatti Muthu	Winnipeg Wesmen	Canada West Universities Athletic Association	Canada	2022–23
Misha Bhandari	Eckerd Tritons	Sunshine State Conference	United States	2024–
Gayathri Manohar⁣⁣	Valkyries	Conference Carolinas	United States	2024–
Rinsha Mariyam	Clube de Albergaria	Liga Feminina Sub 19	Portugal	2025–
Lavanya Upadhyay	Brockport Golden Eagles	Empire 8 Conference	United States	2025–

== See also ==
- Main pages
  - List of India international footballers
  - List of foreign football players in India
  - List of India international footballers born abroad
- Category
  - Footballers from India
  - Indian expatriate footballers
  - Expatriate footballers in India
- Miscellaneous
  - History of Indian football
  - India national football team
  - India women's national team

== Explanatory notes ==
1. Roy made his international debut for Pakistan in 1953, before acquiring Citizenship of India.
2. Mohammed represented India at the Summer Olympics in 1948.
3. Dey represented Pakistan in "China tour of 1964", before acquiring Citizenship of India. He later represented India.
4. Born in Iran, Nassiri settled in India, acquired Citizenship of India, and is father of Indian footballer Kiyan.
5. Vijayan joined Muktijoddha in August 2000 and appeared in five league matches, while the lack of international transfer certificate behind the signing handed him a fine of ₹50,000 by the All India Football Federation in 2001.
6. Born in Japan, Izumi acquired Citizenship of India in 2012, and earned 9 caps with India until 2014.
7. Born in Meghalaya, Malla Thakuri attended national camp of Nepal in 2022, but left shortly, and did not give up Indian citizenship.
8. Born in Delhi, Verma moved to Nepal and represented the Nepal U17 team before acquiring Indian citizenship in 2021.
9. Mohammed Jamshid has Indian citizenship, holds Indian passport, but has represented Qatar U17 team and Qatar senior team since 2024 having only an Indian mission passport to Qatar.
10. Born in Delhi, Hans moved to the UK and acquired British passport, but later began process of being a naturalized Indian citizen in 2019 to represent India.
11. Misha Bhandari represented India U17 team in 2022 before going to represent the United Arab Emirates U20 and United Arab Emirates in 2025.
12. Gayathri Manohar⁣ has represented the United Arab Emirates U20 team in 2023.
13. Born in Canada
14. Born in England
15. Born in Greece
16. Born in Hong Kong
17. Born in Iran
18. Born in Italy
19. Born in Japan
20. Born in Kenya
21. Born in Luxembourg
22. Born in Nepal
23. Born in New Zealand
24. Born in Oman
25. Born in Portugal
26. Born in Qatar
27. Born in Switzerland
28. Born in Tanzania
29. Born in the United Arab Emirates
