= Mohammed Salim (footballer) =

Indian footballer (1904–1980)

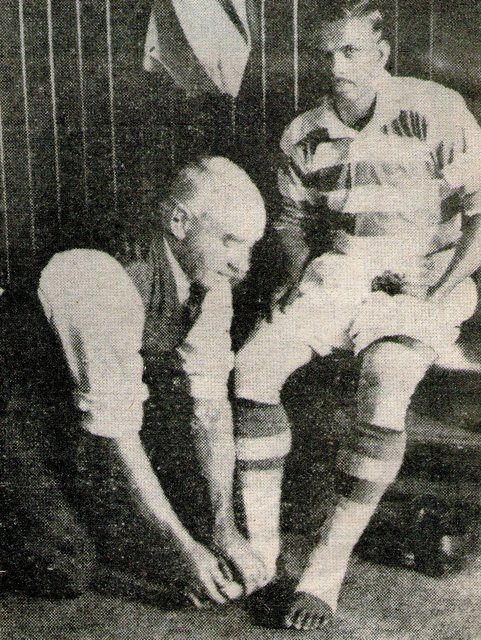
- Salim (right) having his feet bandaged, due to playing barefoot, by Jimmy McMenemy, the Celtic trainer, 1936.

Personal information
- Full name: Mohammed Salim
- Date of birth: 1904
- Place of birth: Calcutta, Bengal Presidency, British India
- Date of death: 5 November 1980 (aged 75–76)
- Place of death: Calcutta, West Bengal, India
- Position: Winger

Senior career*
Years	Team	Apps	(Gls)
1926	Chittaranjan		
1926–1927	Mohammedan		
1927–1931	Sporting Union		
1932	East Bengal		
1933–1934	Aryan		
1934–1936	Mohammedan		
1936	Celtic		
1936–1938	Mohammedan		

International career
1936	India	1	(0)
- * Club domestic league appearances and goals

Mohammed Salim (Audio; 1904 – 5 November 1980), was an Indian footballer who played predominantly as a winger.

Nicknamed the "Indian Juggler", he was best known for his role in the fabled 1930s Mohammedan team which claimed five successive Calcutta Football League titles. He also became the first player from the Indian sub-continent to play for a European club, Celtic.

== Early life ==
Salim was a chemist and a pharmacist from Bengal, born in Metiaburuz, a lower-middle-class locality in Calcutta in 1904. Uninterested in formal academic training, he displayed great footballing skill from childhood. Mohun Bagan's IFA Shield triumph in 1911 also contributed to drawing the young Salim to football.

== Career ==
=== Early career ===
Salim did not find it difficult to join Chittaranjan of Bowbazar, Central Calcutta. Managed by a group of educated Bengali middle-class patrons, their aim was to play and win against European teams. Salim then had a short stint in the B team of Mohammedan. Pankaj Gupta, a Bengali sports administrator who was later the first head coach of the India national team, recruited Salim to play for his club Sporting Union. He went on to spend a season with East Bengal before moving to Aryan under the auspices of Choney Majumdar, a leading sportsman of Bengal.

=== Mohammedan ===
Salim rejoined Mohammedan in 1934 and was finally part of their first team setup. Salim was instrumental in helping the club to five league titles in a row:

With Salim in their ranks, the Club for the first time in its history won the Calcutta Football League. Winning soon became a habit. For the next four years Mohammedan went on to win the coveted title with Salim spearheading the attack. Exceptionally talented, Salim was winning thousands of hearts with his ball control, dribbling, correct passes and lobs. He knew at what height a pass should be given. His passing was one of the greatest attractions for Mohammedan supporters. This winning spree continued for five years and Salim was at the forefront in most of these years. With each triumph the number of his fans multiplied. The more people wanted to touch him and embrace him the more emotional he became. He celebrated his fifth straight league win by shedding a couple of teardrops and by thanking God for having helped him achieve what he wanted.

After the title win of 1936, Salim was invited to play in two exhibition matches against the China Olympic team. The first would be an All India XI and the second would be a select civil and military side. These games were the first international matches played in India, organised by the provincial Indian Football Association, but it was not until the following year that the India national team began in earnest with the founding of the All India Football Federation. The first match between the Indian and Chinese sides was a draw with Noor Mohammed scoring for the Indian team. After the first game, Salim was praised by the Chinese official Dr Chi Chao Yung:

Allow me to congratulate most heartily the members of the India side for their wonderful display of good footwork. In the course of the game they showed perfect understanding and exceptional speed. It was most unlucky that they did not come out the winners. The forwards, Salim, Rahim, Bhattacharjee and Abbas were exceptional in their display.

Before the second match took place, Salim had disappeared. The police were solicited to search for him and advertisements were inserted in newspapers requesting that he join the Civil and Military XI immediately. These efforts were in vain as Salim was en route to Great Britain via Cairo. A relative called Hasheem who lived in England was visiting Calcutta and witnessed the first match. Having seen Salim's exceptional display, Hasheem had persuaded him to try his hand at European football.

=== Celtic ===
After a few days in London, Hasheem took him to Celtic Park in Glasgow, Scotland. Salim was surprised to note that all the Celtic players were professionals but he was confident that he could compete with them. Hasheem spoke to Willie Maley, the Celtic manager, "A great player from India has come by ship. Will you please take a trial of his? But there is a slight problem. Salim plays in bare feet."

The idea of a bare-footed amateur from India competing against Scottish professionals was difficult for Maley to believe but he agreed to give him a trial. Salim was asked to demonstrate his skill before 1,000 club members and three registered coaches. The press accounts noted that Salim played without boots during his appearances for Celtic in 1936. They decided to play him in two upcoming Scottish Football Alliance matches. As both of these games were friendlies, he is not recorded to have played, though.

Salim made his debut in a 5–1 victory against Hamilton Academical, where "he took a penalty and scored with a great shot." He thus became the first player from the Indian sub-continent to play for a European club.

On 28 August 1936, he helped Celtic win 7–1 against Galston. The Scottish Daily Express carried the headline "Indian Juggler – New Style" along with a magical description of Salim:

Ten twinkling toes of Salim, Celtic FC's player from India hypnotised the crowd at Parkhead last night in an Alliance game with Galston. He balances the ball on his big toe, lets it run down the scale to his little toe, twirls it, hops on one foot around the defender, then flicks the ball to the center who has only to send it into goal. Three of Celtic's seven goals last night came from his moves. Was asked to take a penalty, he refused. Said he was shy. Salim does not speak English, his brother translates for him. Brother Hasheem thinks Salim is wonderful – so did the crowd last night.

The following is an excerpt from the Glasgow Observer:

Abdul Salim, Celtic's Indian International trialist, tickled the crowd at Celtic Park on Friday with his magnificent ball manipulation. In his bare feet, he was a conspicuous figure but this was further emphasised by his dark skin against the white and green of the Celtic strip. His play was top class. Every ball he touched went exactly to the place he wanted it to. Not one inch was it out. His crosses into goal were simply shrieking to be nodded into the net. I wouldn't like to have calculated the score had McGrory been playing ..... [Danny] Dawson missed a penalty kick which Salim, despite the invitation of Alex Millar, refused to take.

Alan Breck's book of Scottish football also recorded Salim playing for Celtic:

Celtic introduced a novel touch when, in an Alliance game against Galston, they fielded Abdul Salim, an Indian. Salim played without boots, his feet being tightly bandaged, as the pictures show. Mohamed Hashean, to give him his right name, proved an expert in trapping and lobbing the ball towards goal. He fairly hypnotised the opposing defenders, and seven goals were actually the outcome of his moves. Foreign footballers are by no means rare. But all have played in the regulation boots. Salim preferred to stick to his native way, and, what is more, he "saw the boots off" the other fellows. His accuracy in shooting and ball control greatly tickled the crowd.

Salim soon became homesick and was determined to return to India. Celtic pleaded with him to remain in Scotland for a season, even offering to organise a charity match on his behalf and promising him five percent of the total gate proceeds. Salim refused and asked that the money (£1,800; a large amount of money at the time) be donated to local orphans who were also to be invited to the match. Salim was also offered a professional contract to play in Germany. In the end, he travelled back to India to rejoin Mohammedan in time for the beginning of the 1937 Calcutta Football League.

== Legacy ==
When Salim fell ill due to old age, his second son Rashid Ahmed wrote a letter to Celtic about his illness and stated that he needed money for his treatment:

I had no intention of asking for money. It was just a ploy to find out if Mohammed Salim was still alive in their memory. To my amazement, I received a letter from the club. Inside was a bank draft for £100. I was delighted, not because I received the money but because my father still holds a pride of place in Celtic. I have not even cashed the draft and will preserve it till I die. I just want my father's name to be put as the first Indian footballer to play abroad. That is the only thing that I want and nothing else.

Following Salim's death in 1980, an obituary message in the Amrita Bazar Patrika announced:

Mohammed Salim (Sr) a member of the legendary Mohammedan Sporting Club side that claimed five successive Calcutta senior football league titles in the thirties died in Calcutta on Wednesday morning. He was 76. A right winger in his playing days, he was intimately connected with many sports clubs and took active interest in training youngsters. He is survived by his wife, four sons and three daughters.

== Honours ==
Mohammedan Sporting Club

- Calcutta Football League: 1934, 1935, 1936, 1937, 1938
- IFA Shield: 1936

Individual

- Dr. Bidhan Chandra Roy State Award: 1976
- Lifetime Achievement Award by the Mohammedan Sporting: 2023

== See also ==
- List of Indian football players in foreign leagues

== Notes ==
ബൂട്ടിടാത്ത ആ ഇന്ത്യക്കാരനെ യൂറോപ്യൻ ക്ലബ് ഇന്നും ഓർക്കുന്നുണ്ട്'; ഇന്ത്യ മറന്ന മുഹമ്മദ് സലീമിന്റെ കഥ
