= Mauricio Afonso =

Indian footballer

Personal information
- Date of birth: 16 November 1961 (age 64)
- Place of birth: Chinchinim, Goa
- Position: Midfielder

Team information
- Current team: Dempo (Head coach)

Senior career*
Years	Team	Apps	(Gls)
1978–1980	Chinchinim		
1980–1981	Salcete		
1981–1984	Salgaocar		
1984–1989	Dempo		

International career
- India

Managerial career
- 2016–: Dempo
- * Club domestic league appearances and goals

Mauricio Afonso is a former Indian footballer who played as a midfielder for India in the 1984 Asian Cup. He also played for CRC Chinchinim, Salcete, Salgaocar and Dempo. He has most recently managed Dempo in the Goa Professional League.

He has also represented India in 1983 Bangladesh President's Gold Cup and the 1983 Pre-Olympic qualifiers in New Delhi, Singapore, Kuala Lumpur and Riyadh.

== Honours ==
India

- South Asian Games Bronze medal: 1989

Goa

- Santosh Trophy: 1983–84

Individual

- Bakshi Bahaddar Jivbadada Kerkar Award: 1994

== See also ==
- List of India national football team captains
