= Kabir Kohli =

Indian association football goalkeeper

Personal information
- Date of birth: 4 March 2000 (age 26)
- Place of birth: India
- Position: Goalkeeper

Team information
- Current team: Sudeva Delhi

Senior career*
Years	Team	Apps	(Gls)
2019–2020	Olímpic de Xàtiva	0	(0)
2020–2021	CD Llosa	17	(0)
2021–	Sudeva Delhi	1	(0)
- * Club domestic league appearances and goals

Kabir Kohli (born 4 March 2000) is an Indian footballer who plays as a goalkeeper for Sudeva Delhi. Besides India, he has played in Spain.

== Career ==
In 2019, Kohli signed for Spanish fourth tier side Olímpic de Xàtiva from Sudeva Moonlight. In 2020, he signed for CD Llosa of Regional Preferente de la Comunidad Valenciana. In 2021, he signed for Indian club Sudeva Delhi after trialing for the reserves of FC Bayern in the German Bundesliga. On 25 April 2022, Kohli debuted for Sudeva Delhi during a 1–0 win over TRAU.

== See also ==
- List of Indian football players in foreign leagues
