= Overseas Indian representation in Indian sports =

The Overseas Indian representation in Indian sports refers to the participation of foreign nationals of Indian origin in international events of both senior and junior level representing the Republic of India. As India prohibits dual nationality, sports representation in international events with respect to Indian participation has generally followed the norm of selection of sportspeople of Indian nationality.

Despite this due to the ambiguity of representation law till 2008, many Overseas Indian sportspeople have represented India at international events. While individual sports such as tennis, figure skating etc, dominate Overseas Indian sportspeople representation, rugby union remains the only major team sport with Overseas Indian players, until 2008 when the Overseas Indians were disqualified from representing India.

== History ==
In India however, the National sports representation law stems from a circular issued by the Ministry of Youth Affairs and Sports in December 2008, wherein it directed all national sports federations that any sportsperson representing India at the international level must hold a valid Indian passport. The rule was upheld in 2010 by the Delhi High Court in the Karm Kumar vs Union Of India and Ors.

The Indian law, with respect to the eligibility of Overseas Indians representing India stands at odds with the eligibility criteria for national representation of any sports governing bodies since 2008 when the current regulations were enforced and Overseas Indian representation was abolished. Before 2008 order and 2011 enactment of National Sports Code, due to ambiguity and lack of any sports law in the country with respect to player representation in international events, many Overseas Indian sportspeople had represented India in certain sports such as tennis, winter sports, swimming, etc.

== Overseas Indian sportspeople representing India ==
This is a list of Overseas Indian sportspeople (both men and women) who have represented or are currently representing India in any sport at international level.

- Players of Indian origin, who represented India while retaining their original nationality.
- Players of Indian origin, who represented India while or after giving up their original nationality and taking up Indian citizenship.
- Players who were born abroad but had Indian nationality by birth are not considered for the list.

Note:

- Representation after 2008: Despite the 2008 rule change, a handful of Overseas Indians continued to represent India in certain individual sports such as tennis, winter sports, badminton etc., but this continued without Indian sports federations' support and also international rules for national representation remained unchanged. But while they represented India on an individual capacity at the international events, due to the withdrawal of the Indian sports federations' administrative and financial support, they remained ineligible to represent India at multi-sport events such as Olympics, Asian Games, Commonwealth Games.
- Dual citizenship for minors: Dual citizenship in India is allowed in certain cases of minor children, as those who are born outside the territory of India can obtain Indian citizenship through descent (by Section 4 of The Citizenship Act, 1955) as well as of the foreign country (by Jus soli, e.g. United States). Thus the minors in such cases can remain dual citizens till 18 upon which they will have to choose only one citizenship. This has enabled some minor Overseas Indians to represent India post 2008, but will become ineligible if they choose the foreign citizenship upon attaining majority.
- Status of Unrecognised sports: Certain major sports such as Mixed martial arts (MMA) have not been recognised by the Ministry of Youth Affairs and Sports (India) as a sport in India, which are instead held as events. The Indian MMA federations do not form a part of the National Sports Federations and thus they are not covered under the National Sports Code 2011. Thus the Overseas Indian fighters can represent India as individual representatives at professional MMA fights as they do not come under the purview of any sports federation.

Color key

- Acquired Indian nationality

== Team sports ==
=== Cricket ===
Sportsperson	Nationality	Years	Notable events	Ref
Lall Singh	Malaysia	1932		
Robin Singh	Trinidad and Tobago	1989–2001	Cricket World Cup	

=== Football ===
Sportsperson	Nationality	Years	Notable events	Ref
Balai Dey	Pakistan	1969–1970	Merdeka Tournament	
Arata Izumi	Japan	2013–2014	AFC Challenge Cup, SAFF Championship	
Sunny Dhaliwal	Canada	2017	FIFA U-17 World Cup	
Ryan Williams	Australia	2026–	AFC Asian Cup qualifiers	

=== Field hockey ===
Sportsperson	Nationality	Years	Notable events	Ref
Trevor Fernandes	Tanzania	1971–1973		

=== Rugby union ===
Sportsperson	Nationality	Years	Notable events	Ref
Manmandir Singh Samra	United Kingdom	2004–2008		
Simon Patel Knowles	United Kingdom	2004–2006		
Amarveer Singh Ladhar	United Kingdom	2004–2006		
Ajay Sabharwal	United Kingdom	2004–2006		
Alexander Walker	United Kingdom	2004		
Christopher Walker	United Kingdom	2004		
Francis Brown	United Kingdom	2004–2008		
Timothy Wilkes	United Kingdom	2006		

== Individual sports ==
=== Chess ===
Sportsperson	Nationality	Years	Notable events	Ref
Dibyendu Barua	Pakistan	1978–2024		
Akshat Chandra	United States	2009–2012		
Tarun Kanyamarala	Ireland	2014–2017		
Trisha Kanyamarala	Ireland	2014–2017		
Amaya Agarwal	England	2022–2023		
Anay Agarwal	England	2022–2023		
Ashwath Kaushik	Singapore	2022		

=== Boxing ===
Sportsperson	Nationality	Years	Notable events	Ref
Zoramthanga	(Myanmar) Burma	1989–1990	World Championships, Commonwealth Games	

=== Tennis ===
Sportsperson	Nationality	Years	Notable events	Ref
Prakash Amritraj	United States	2002–2013	Grand Slams, Davis Cup	
Stephen Amritraj	United States	2003–2008		
Shikha Uberoi	United States	2005–2011	Asian Games, Fed Cup	
Sunitha Rao	United States	2007–2009	Summer Olympics, Fed Cup	
Kanika Vaidya	Singapore; United States	2008–2018		
Krisha Mahendran	United States	2022–		
Aishi Bisht	United States	2022–		
Vihaan Reddy	United States	2023–2024		

=== Figure skating ===
Sportsperson	Nationality	Years	Notable events	Ref
Ami Parekh	United States	2006–2014	Worlds, Four Continents	
Amar Mehta	United States	2007	World Juniors	
Yoniko Eva Washington	United States	2008–2010	Worlds	
Mayuri Bhandari	United States	2008		
Anavi Tekriwal	United States	2013		
Shreya Saha Dalal	United States	2015		
Arunima Verabelli	United States	2017		
Tara Prasad	United States	2020–	Four Continents	

=== Squash ===
Sportsperson	Nationality	Years	Notable events	Ref
Karm Kumar	United Kingdom	2006	Asian Junior Championships	

=== Swimming ===
Sportsperson	Nationality	Years	Notable events	Ref
Ankur Poseria	United States	2006–2008	Summer Olympics, World Championships, Asian Games	

=== Shooting ===
Sportsperson	Nationality	Years	Notable events	Ref
Sohrab Singh Gill	United States	2007	Asian Championships	

=== Gymnastics ===
Sportsperson	Nationality	Years	Notable events	Ref
Veronika Yadav	Ukraine	2017–		

=== Badminton ===
Sportsperson	Nationality	Years	Notable events	Ref
Srivedya Gurazada	United States	2019–2022		

=== Skiing ===
Sportsperson	Nationality	Years	Notable events	Ref
Leona Dogra	Switzerland	2019		

== Other sports ==
=== Mixed martial arts (Pro MMA) ===
Sportsperson	Nationality	Years	Notable events	Ref
Arjan Bhullar	Canada	2017–	UFC, ONE FC	
Gurdarshan Mangat	Canada	2019–	ONE FC	

== See also ==
- Indian diaspora
- List of India international footballers born outside India
