= Ankit Sharma (footballer) =

Indian footballer (born 1991)

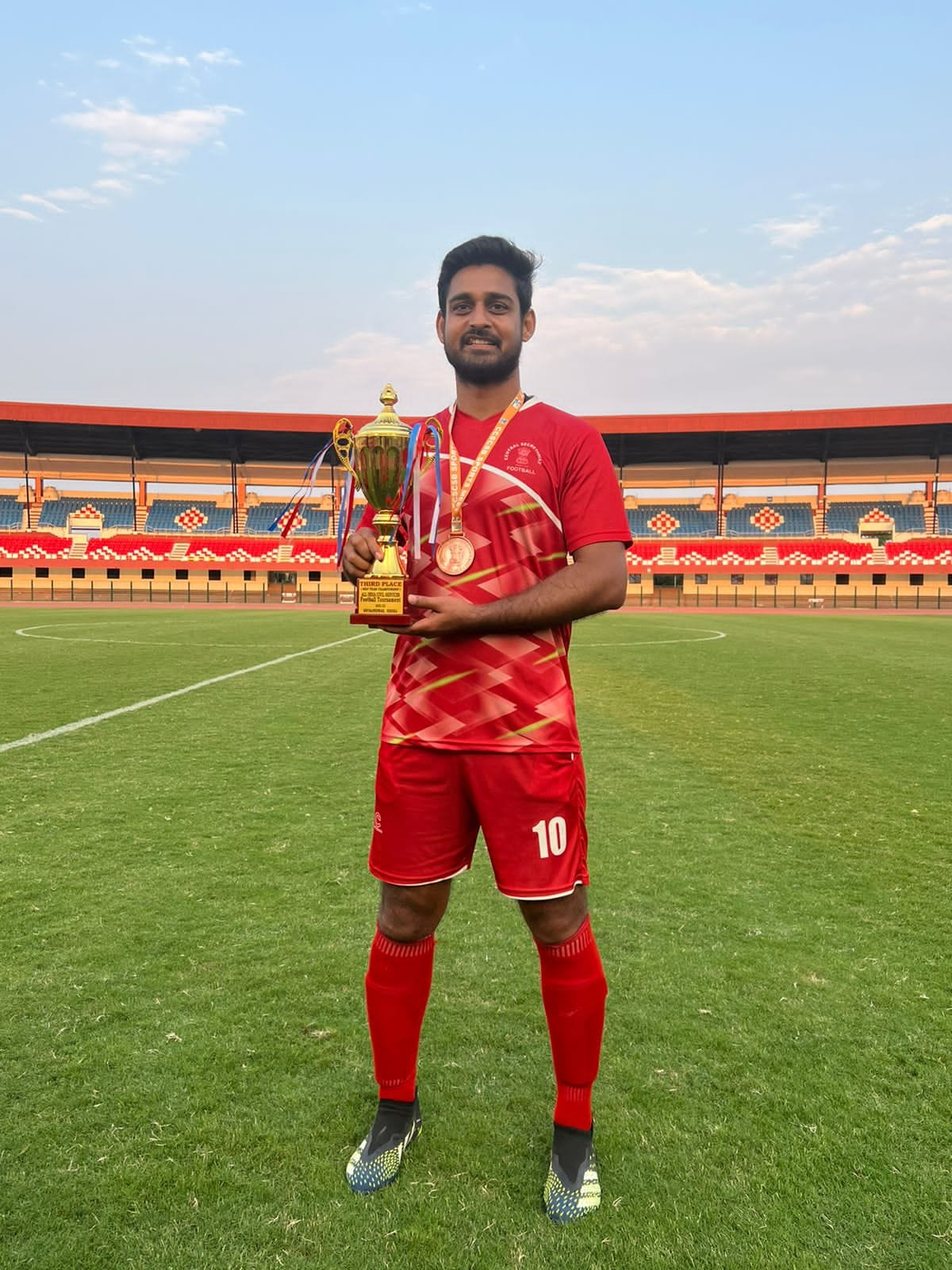
- Ankit Sharma at Kalinga Football Stadium, Odisha.

Personal information
- Full name: Ankit Sharma
- Date of birth: 30 July 1991 (age 35)
- Place of birth: New Delhi, India
- Height: 1.78 m (5 ft 10 in)
- Positions: Midfielder; striker

Team information
- Current team: Bhawanipore FC
- Number: 10

Youth career
- 2002–2009: Air Force Bal Bharati School
- 2007–2009: Youngmen Sports Club
- 2002–2009: DDA Academy

Senior career*
Years	Team	Apps	(Gls)
2010–2011	HAL	12	(1)
2011–2012	Deportivo San Cristóbal	8	(0)
2012–2013	Bhawanipore	10	(1)

International career
2010	India U19	6	(0)
- * Club domestic league appearances and goals

Ankit Sharma (born 30 July 1991, in New Delhi) is an Indian professional football player who play as Midfielder and Striker. He has played for Delhi Football Team, Youth Indian National teams, HAL Bangalore and Deportivo San Cristóbal in the Divisiones Regionales de Fútbol in the Community of Madrid, Spain. He is the first Indian to sign a professional contract with a Spanish Club and the fifth Indian to play overseas in the history of Indian Football.

== Club career ==
=== HAL ===
Ankit's professional career began at the young age of 19 with HAL in the I-league, 2010–11 season. Sharma got injured in the Dr. B.C Roy Trophy Semi-Final match and had a six-month outing, but he recovered well and came back after recovering from a knee injury. He appeared in all the matches post-signing for Hindustan Aeronautics Limited S.C. in 2010–11 season

He had one of the rarest and saddest experiences while playing his trade at his first club. HAL goalkeeper Arun Kumar collided with Ankit in a training session just before the match against Pune FC, fracturing his right shin bone and injuring Ankit's right knee, which kept him out of training for a week's rest.

=== San Cristobal ===
Ankit Sharma became the first Indian to sign a professional contract with a Spanish Club in 2011-12 and the fifth Indian to play overseas in the history of Indian Football. He signed for Spanish club Deportivo San Cristóbal in the Divisiones Regionales de Fútbol in the Community of Madrid after a successful season with HAL in I-league 2010–11 season.

=== Bhawanipore ===
For 2012–13, he signed a contract with IInd Division I-League and Calcutta Football League outfit Bhawanipore FC.

== Honours ==
India U-19

- Dr. B.C. Roy Trophy: 2009-10 (Captain, IInd Runners-Up)

HAL

- I-league 2010-11

== See also ==
- List of Indian football players in foreign leagues
