= Don Fernandes =

Indian association football player

Personal information
- Full name: Don Bosco Fernandes
- Date of birth: 28 March 1990 (age 36)
- Place of birth: Goa, India
- Height: 5 ft 7 in (1.69 m)
- Position: Defender

Team information
- Current team: Goan United

Senior career*
Years	Team	Apps	(Gls)
2014–2015	Sporting Goa	4	(0)
2015–2016	DSK Shivajians	5	(0)
2020–	Goan United		
- * Club domestic league appearances and goals

Don Bosco Fernandes (born 28 March 1990) is an Indian footballer who plays as a defender for Goan United FC in the Middlesex County Football League.

== Career ==
Fernandes made his professional debut for Sporting Clube de Goa during their first match of the 2014–15 I-League season on 18 January 2015 against East Bengal. He started the match and played 62 minutes as Sporting Goa drew the match 1–1.

== Career statistics ==
As of 22 January 2016

Club	Season	League			Federation Cup		Durand Cup		AFC		Total	
Club	Season	Division	Apps	Goals	Apps	Goals	Apps	Goals	Apps	Goals	Apps	Goals
Sporting Goa	2014–15	I-League	4	0	0	0	0	0	—	—	4	0
DSK Shivajians	2015–16	I-League	2	0	0	0	0	0	—	—	2	0
Career total			6	0	0	0	0	0	0	0	6	0

== See also ==
- List of Indian football players in foreign leagues
