= Kabir Nath =

Indian footballer (born 2000)

Personal information
- Full name: Kabir Baruah Nath
- Date of birth: 22 September 2000 (age 26)
- Place of birth: Assam, India
- Height: 1.83 m (6 ft 0 in)
- Position: Left winger

Team information
- Current team: CE Carroi
- Number: 46

Youth career
- 2017–2019: Cambrils Unió

Senior career*
Years	Team	Apps	(Gls)
2018–2019	Reddis	9	(1)
2019–2020	Olímpic de Xàtiva	3	(0)
2020–2021	Palamós	0	(0)
2021	UE Engordany	5	(0)
2021–2022	Villajoyosa	6	(0)
2022	Tortosa	3	(1)
2022–2023	Tarragona	9	(18)
2023	Ascó	2	(0)
2023–2024	Atlètic Amèrica	15	(1)
2024–2025	FS La Massana	21	(0)
2025–	CE Carroi	17	(1)
- * Club domestic league appearances and goals as of 15 June 2026

Kabir Nath (born 22 September 2000) is an Indian professional footballer who plays as a midfielder, mainly as a left-winger, for Primera Divisió club CE Carroi.

== Club career ==
=== Earlier career ===
Nath moved to Spain at a very early age, joining Liga Nacional Juvenil de Fútbol club Cambrils Unió CF U17 in 2017.

=== Senior career ===
In 2019, he joined Tercera División RFEF club CD Olímpic de Xàtiva. In 2020, he moved to Palamós CF. In December 2021, he signed a contract with Andorran Primera Divisió outfit UE Engordany. In 2024, he moved to FS La Massana.

== Personal life ==
Nath is son of Kalpajit Nath and Geeta Baruah Nath, both are doctors from Assam, who are based in Delhi.

== See also ==
- List of Indian expatriate footballers
