= Abneet Bharti =

Footballer (born 1998)

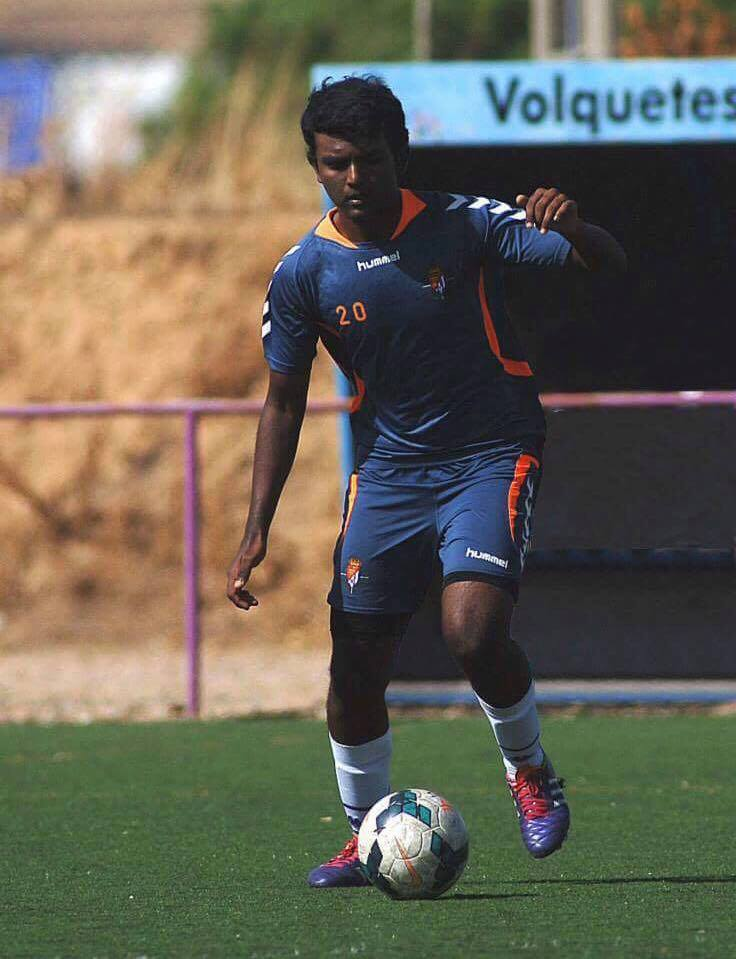
- Bharti with Real Valladolid in 2015

Personal information
- Date of birth: 14 July 1998 (age 28)
- Place of birth: Kathmandu, Nepal
- Height: 1.85 m (6 ft 1 in)
- Position: Centre-back

Team information
- Current team: ABB

Youth career
- Shastri
- 2012–2013: Geylang International
- 2013–2014: Balestier Khalsa
- 2014–2015: Real Valladolid

Senior career*
Years	Team	Apps	(Gls)
2017–2019	Sintrense	13	(0)
2019–2020	Kerala Blasters	0	(0)
2021–2025	Varnsdorf	2	(0)
2022	→ Talant Tash-Kömür (loan)	6	(0)
2023	→ Costa del Este (loan)	4	(0)
2024	→ Sol de Mayo (loan)	8	(0)
2025	→ El Linqueño (loan)	0	(0)
2025–2026	ABB	10	(0)
- * Club domestic league appearances and goals as of 08:46, 28 April 2026 (UTC)

Abneet Bharti (born 14 July 1998) is a professional footballer who last plays as a centre-back for División Profesional club Academia del Balompié Boliviano. Born in Nepal, he has been called up to the India national team several times but has never played due to NOC issues.

== Club career ==
=== Early career ===
After spending two years playing football at a school in Nigeria, he returned to India and represented the team of BGS International Public School in Delhi. He then started his youth football career in DSA Senior Division League outfit Shastri FC and emerged as top scorer in multiple tournaments.

In 2010, at 12 years old, Bharti moved to Delhi and earned a spot in Delhi's state youth team and was later called up to the India national U16 team. After spending two years in Delhi, Bharti moved abroad and attended a two-week trial with the Singaporean side Geylang International and broke into club's youth academy, earning a youth contract at 13 years old. A year later, Bharti signed for another Singaporean side, Balestier Khalsa, playing in their U16 squad.

In 2014, Bharti moved to Spain and joined youth academy of La Liga club Real Valladolid, where he also completed his studies. While playing for the club, he received interest from the academies of Eintracht Frankfurt and Anderlecht. He later had trials at youth sides of Eintracht Frankfurt, 1860 Munich, FSV Frankfurt and Darmstadt 98.

=== Sintrense ===
In July 2015, Bharti was reported to have agreed terms with Polish top flight club Podbeskidzie Bielsko-Biała, but the move never materialised. In the midst of 2016–17 season, he signed for then Portuguese League 3 outfit Sintrense. He made his debut against Sporting CP B and appeared in thirteen league games under coaching of Luís Boa Morte, who described him "a very fast and athletic defender, with confidence and technique on the ball". Bharti also played the entire match in the first round of the 2018–19 Taça de Portugal against 1º Dezembro in a 2–1 away win.

=== Kerala Blasters ===
After being scouted by Mexican club América, his move to Liga MX in Apertura 2018 season, was not done due to a serious knee injury, which ruled him out of action for couple of months. On 31 August 2019, Bharti returned to India signing with Indian Super League club Kerala Blasters. He joined the club after taking down his chance of appearing with América in the Mexican top flight.

=== Varnsdorf ===
In July 2021, Bharti signed for Fortuna Národní Liga side Varnsdorf. With the Czech club, he made his debut in their 4–0 win over Neratovice–Byškovice. He appeared two times in the 2021–22 Czech Cup before facing the visa issues.

==== Loan move ====
Before the start of the 2022–23 season, Bharti was loaned out to Kyrgyz Premier League club Talant Tash-Kömür on 8 March. He made his league debut on 11 March in their 1–1 draw against Dordoi Bishkek. After end of his short loan spell in the Kyrgyz club, he rejoined Varnsdorf in June. In March 2023, the club once again sent him on a loan spell as he joined Panamanian Liga LPF club Costa del Este.

On 28 June 2024, Bharti was loaned out to Argentine club Deportivo Sol de Mayo. He made his debut as a substitute for the club on 30 June, against Kimberley de Mar del Plata in their 3–2 win in Group A of the Torneo Federal A. On 19 August, Bharti managed to draw a foul in a penalty box where Fernando Valdebenito went on to scored the goal, however, the club suffered a 4–1 defeat to San Martín de Mendoza. Bharti then moved to another Argentine club El Linqueño on loan.

=== ABB ===
In March 2025, Bharti signed for the Bolivian Primera División club Academia Balompié Boliviano on a permanent transfer. He make his debut playing the entire match on 26 June in a 2025 Copa Bolivia match against San Antonio Bulo Bulo.

== International career ==
Eligible to represent both his native Nepal and India, Bharti was called up to the India national U16 team national camp ahead of 2015 SAFF U-16 Championship, but he has never made it to main team.

Born to Indian parents in Nepal, Bharti was brought up in Nigeria and Italy, before moving to Delhi at the age of 12 and later, moved with his family to stayed in Singapore.

== Personal life ==
After I was born in Kathmandu, Nepal, I moved to Rome, Italy, in 2001 and stayed there till I was 7 years old. I was quite young then and due to surroundings in Italy I was aware of the beautiful game, but I still hardly played it and I only remember watching the Euro 2004 while I was in Italy. To be honest, Italy didn't contribute too much to my passion for football. After Italy, I moved to Nigeria and that was when the World Cup 2006 was taking place and living in another football crazy country like Nigeria, was when my passion started to slowly develop. So to sum it up, it was the World Cup 2006 that made me find passion for football.

— Abneet Bharti, on his early life and the beginning of football career.

Abneet's brother, Aniket Bharti, is also a professional footballer who currently plays for Bulgarian club Logomotiv GO, and formerly Colombian clubs Orsomarso and Independiente Santa Fe.

Bharti revealed that he is supporter of Premier League club Arsenal.

== Reception ==
In 2018, the Italian professional football magazine Calciomercato included him in the best eleven players from Asia under the age of twenty-one. Along with him, for example, Iranian forward Mohammad Sharifi, North Korean forward Kwang-Song Han or Chinese midfielder Jiahao Wang were selected.

== See also ==
- List of Indian football players in foreign leagues
