= Nazir Ahmed Alok =

Bangladeshi footballer

Personal information
- Full name: Nazir Ahmed Alok
- Date of birth: 1 December 1960 (age 65)
- Place of birth: Dhaka, East Pakistan (present-day Bangladesh)
- Positions: Right-back; center-back

Senior career*
Years	Team	Apps	(Gls)
1974–1977	Kamal SC		
1979	Mohammedan SC	1	(0)
1980–1981	Rahmatganj MFS		
1982–1983	Mohammedan SC		
1984–1985	Dhaka Abahani		
1986–1987	Mohammedan SC		
1988–1989	Agrani Bank SC		
1989–1990	Mohammedan SC		

International career
1982	Bangladesh B		
1982–1985	Bangladesh		
- * Club domestic league appearances and goals

Nazir Ahmed Alok (Bengali: নাজির আহমেদ আলোক; born 1 December 1960) is a retired Bangladeshi footballer who played as a defender.

== Early life ==
Alok spent his childhood in Tejkunipara, Tejgaon, showing a strong interest in athletics during his school years. He initially studied at Tejgaon Intermediate Technical School before attending BAF Shaheen College Dhaka for athletics, where he caught the eye of football coach Bazlur Rahman, who encouraged him to join Kamal Sporting Club, a Second Division team, in 1974.

== Club career ==
Alok represented Kamal Sporting Club in the Second Division from 1974 to 1977, but a leg injury in his final season sidelined him for a year. In 1979, he joined Mohammedan SC in the First Division on the recommendation of Shamsul Alam Manju, making a single substitute appearance against Brothers Union. In 1981, he moved to Rahmatganj MFS, where he became a regular starter and played for two seasons.

In 1982, Alok returned to Mohammedan, forming a strong defensive partnership with Abul Hossain and Azharul Haque Tipu under coach Golam Sarwar Tipu, and helped the team secure a domestic double and the Ashis-Jabbar Shield Tournament in India. He joined Abahani Krira Chakra in 1984, winning two First Division titles in two seasons, before returning to Mohammedan in 1986 to win league titles in 1986 and 1987. In 1988, he joined newly promoted, Agrani Bank SC as club captain under former Mohammedan coach, Golam Sarwar Tipu.

== International career ==
Alok represented Bangladesh Green (B national team) at the 1982 and 1983 editions of the Bangladesh President's Gold Cup held in Dhaka. On 20 November 1982, he debuted for the Bangladesh national team against India at the 1982 Asian Games held in New Delhi. Under German coach, Gerd Schmidt, he appeared in all three Asian Games matches for Bangladesh. He also represented the national team at the 1983 Merdeka Tournament and 1984 AFC Asian Cup qualifiers. In 1985, Alok played all six games at the 1986 FIFA World Cup qualification – AFC first round. In the same year, Alok made his final appearances for the national team at the 1985 Quaid-e-Azam International Tournament held in Peshawar. He was also included in the final squad for the 1986 Asian Games held in Seoul, although he failed to make a single appearance in the tournament due to an injury.

== Post-retirement ==
Following his retirement, Alok worked with the Bangladesh Football Federation and served as the Team Manager of the Bangladesh U17 during their successful 2006 AFC U-17 Championship qualification campaign under coach Mahabub Hossain Roksy. Eventually, he distanced himself from football after taking up a job at Bangladesh Customs.

== Honours ==
Abahani Krira Chakra

- Dhaka First Division League: 1984, 1985
- Federation Cup: 1985

Mohammedan SC

- Dhaka First Division League: 1982, 1986, 1987
- Federation Cup: 1987, 1989
- Ashis-Jabbar Shield Tournament: 1982
