= 2005–06 Hong Kong Elite Youth League =

The 2005–06 Hong Kong Elite Youth League was the second of the Hong Kong Elite Youth League.

== Fixtures and results ==
| Home \ Away | HKF | KIT | KLC | RGS | SSC | TMN |
|---|---|---|---|---|---|---|
| Hong Kong FC | | 0–1 | 2–3 | 1–2 | 4–0 | 2–3 |
| Kitchee | 1–0 | | 2–3 | 0–1 | 9–1 | 0–3 |
| Kowloon City | 0–1 | 1–2 | | 0–5 | 2–0 | 1–1 |
| Rangers | 3–0 | 3–0 | 3–0 | | 4–0 | 3–0 |
| Sun Source | 0–7 | 0–1 | 0–2 | 1–8 | | 1–4 |
| Tuen Mun | 5–4 | 5–1 | 2–1 | 0–1 | 3–2 | |

Source: The Hong Kong Football Association
Legend: Blue = home team win; Yellow = draw; Red = away team win.

== League table ==
| Pos | Team | Pld | W | D | L | GF | GA | GD | Pts |
|---|---|---|---|---|---|---|---|---|---|
| 1 | Rangers | 10 | 10 | 0 | 0 | 33 | 2 | +31 | 30 |
| 2 | Tuen Mun | 10 | 7 | 1 | 2 | 26 | 16 | +10 | 22 |
| 3 | Kitchee | 10 | 5 | 0 | 5 | 17 | 17 | 0 | 15 |
| 4 | Kowloon City | 10 | 4 | 1 | 5 | 13 | 18 | −5 | 13 |
| 5 | Hong Kong FC | 10 | 3 | 0 | 7 | 21 | 18 | +3 | 9 |
| 6 | Sun Source | 10 | 0 | 0 | 10 | 5 | 44 | −39 | 0 |

Source: The Hong Kong Football Association
Rules for classification: 1) points; 2) goal difference; 3) number of goals scored.
