= Arnold Rodrigues =

British footballer (born 1954)

Personal information
- Full name: Arnold Rodrigues
- Date of birth: 1954 (age 71–72)
- Place of birth: Dar es Salaam, Tanganyika Territory
- Position: Midfielder

Youth career
- 1971–1972: Mapusa Youth

Senior career*
Years	Team	Apps	(Gls)
1972–1974	Panvel SC		
1974–1984	Salgaocar		
1984–1989	Croydon		
1995–2004	Simba SC		

International career
1977–1984	India		
- * Club domestic league appearances and goals

Arnold Rodrigues (born c. 1954) is a former footballer who played as a midfielder for Salgaocar. Born in Tanzania, he represented India internationally, after making his debut in 1977.

== Early life ==
Rodrigues was born in Dar es Salaam, Tanganyika Territory, to Goan parents, before being sent to a boarding school Monte de Guirim School in Bardez, Goa, India. His family hailed from Orlim, Salcete, Goa.

== Career ==
Rodrigues played for the club Salgaocar and the Goa football team at the Santosh Trophy.

In 1989, Rodrigues signed with Croydon of Isthmian Football League. He also appeared with English Non-League football outfit Simba, a team having Goan players.

== Style of play ==
Rodrigues was known for his speed and dribbling ability.

== Personal life ==
Rodrigues is married, has lived in London, England, is a British citizen, and is a supporter of English Premier League side Liverpool.

== Honours ==
India

- King's Cup third place: 1977

Salgaocar

- Puttiah Memorial Trophy: 1978

Goa

- Santosh Trophy: 1983–84

Panvel SC

- Bandodkar Gold Trophy: 1974

Individual

- Santosh Trophy Best Player: 1983–84

== See also ==
- Goans in football
- History of Indian football
- List of Indian expatriate footballers
