= Azlan Johar =

Malaysian footballer

Azlan Johar (born 1963 in Johor) is a former Malaysian striker. He formerly played with Selangor FA, Terengganu FA and ATM FA.

He also the former member of Malaysia national team in 1983–1987.

== Honours ==
Selangor FA

- Malaysia Cup: 1986

Malaysia

- Pestabola Merdeka: 1986
