= Castelo Forte FC =

Portuguese football club

Castelo Forte
- Full name: Castelo Forte Futebol Clube
- Founded: 10 September 2005; 20 years ago
- Ground: Dr. Simões Alves, Oeiras, Portugal
- Capacity: 400
- Manager: Marco Antonio Anjos
- League: AF Lisboa 2° Divisão
- Website: castelofortefc.pt
Home colours	Away colours

Castelo Forte FC is a Portuguese football club from Oeiras, Portugal. It was founded on 10 September 2005, and currently plays in the AF Lisboa 2° Divisão, the sixth tier of Portuguese football. They share their home stadium Dr. Simões Alves with U.D.R. Algés, the local team from the parish of Algés (Oeiras).

During 2016–17 season, the club roped in four Indian players, Deep Moorjani, Gautam Medikonda, Andrew Kyle Silva, and Vansh Shrisvastava in their squad.

== Current squad ==
Note: Flags indicate national team as defined under FIFA eligibility rules; some limited exceptions apply. Players may hold more than one non-FIFA nationality.

No.	Pos.	Nation	Player
—	GK	POR	Igor Eduardo
—	GK	POR	Iago Campos
—	DF	POR	Gonçalo Camacho
—	DF	POR	Pedro Roda
—	DF	POR	Ivo Toupa
—	DF	IND	Gautam Medikonda
—	MF	POR	Yuri Pina
—	MF	POR	Yannick Duarte
—	MF	POR	João Leal
—	MF	POR	Rafael Paiva

No.	Pos.	Nation	Player
—	MF	POR	Aílton Veiga
—	MF	POR	Paulo Atanasio
—	MF	IND	Andrew Silva
—	FW	POR	Leonel Coelho
—	FW	POR	Junior Correia
—	FW	POR	Emiliano Borges
—	FW	POR	Fábio Tavares
—	FW	POR	Gabriel Anjos
—	FW	POR	Kuli Barbosa
—	FW	IND	Deep Moorjani

== See also ==
- List of football clubs in Portugal
