= Aniket Bharti =

Italian footballer (born 2003)

Personal information
- Full name: Aniket Bharti
- Date of birth: 10 May 2003 (age 23)
- Place of birth: Rome, Italy
- Height: 1.88 m (6 ft 2 in)
- Position: Forward

Team information
- Current team: Polanka nad Odrou

Youth career
- –2016: Lechia Gdańsk
- 2016–2020: Znicz Pruszków
- 2023–2026: Independiente Santa Fe

Senior career*
| Years | Team | Apps | (Gls) |
| 2022–2023 | Orsomarso | | |
| 2026– | Polanka nad Odrou | 5 | (1) |

International career
- India U17
- * Club domestic league appearances and goals as of 21:44, 22 October 2026 (UTC)

Aniket Bharti (born 10 May 2003) is a footballer who plays as a forward for Polanka nad Odrou. Born in Italy, he was an India youth international.

== Club career ==
Bharti began his youth career in Poland with Lechia Gdańsk. In 2016, he moved to the youth setup of another Polish club Znicz Pruszków. In March 2022, Bharti signed for Orsomarso, a Colombian second division team, on a free transfer. He quickly impressed at the reserve level and was promoted to the first team.

In September 2023, Bharti signed for Independiente Santa Fe, initially joining their U20 team. He was later loaned to Bulgarian club Lokomotiv Gorna, but the spell was cut short and he returned to Santa Fe after becoming the victim of a robbery.

== International career ==
Bharti has been represented in the list of Indian expatriate footballers as the part of the youth national teams.

== Personal life ==
Bharti was born in Rome, Italy, and has Indian citizenship. He is the brother of footballer Abneet Bharti.
