= Hong Kong Elite Youth League =

- Founded: 2004
- Folded: 2009
- Country: Hong Kong
- Confederation: AFC
- Number of clubs: 17
- Last champions: Workable Elite (2007–08)
- Most championships: Rangers (2 titles)
- Website: http://www.hkfa.com/en/

Hong Kong Elite Youth League (Chinese: 精英青年聯賽) was a Hong Kong youth football league established in 2004.

== Competition format ==
- Each team plays the other teams once.
- If two or more clubs obtained equal points, their place shall be determined as follows:

1. Greater number of points obtained in the league matches between the clubs concerned.
2. Goal difference resulting from the league matches between the clubs concerned.
3. Greater number of goals scored in the group matches between the clubs concerned.

== Winners ==
Season	Winner (number of titles)	Runner-up	Third place
2004–05	Kitchee (1)	Rangers	
2005–06	Rangers (1)	Tuen Mun	Kitchee
2006–07	Rangers (2)	Tai Po	HKFC
2007–08	Workable (1)	Rangers	Hong Kong C Team
2008–09			
