= Pem Dorji =

Indian footballer (1959–2001)

Personal information
- Date of birth: 1 January 1959
- Place of birth: Ben, South Sikkim, Kingdom of Sikkim
- Date of death: 18 October 2001 (aged 42)
- Place of death: Kolkata, West Bengal, India
- Positions: Defender; midfielder

Senior career*
Years	Team	Apps	(Gls)
1978–1979	Mahendra Police		
1980–1982	Mohammedan		
- East Bengal
- Mohammedan
- Mohun Bagan
- FCI

International career
- India
- * Club domestic league appearances and goals

Pem Dorji (1 January 1959 – 18 October 2001) was an Indian footballer who played as a defender and represented the India national team in international tournaments including the 1984 Asian Cup. He also played for the major Calcutta clubs Mohun Bagan, East Bengal, Mohammedan Sporting.

== Early life and career ==
Born in 1959 in a small hamlet of Ben in South Sikkim to parents Ganesh Kumari Gurung and Gyampu T Chingapa, Pem Dorji completed his education from Pelling Senior Secondary School in West Sikkim. From his early childhood days, Dorji started playing football.

His passion for the game made him the part of the first Sikkimese football team which played at the National Championship at Coimbatore in 1976. The game passaged his entry towards the world of football as a professional player. Dorji played predominantly as a defender and midfielder and scripted many memorable performances during a career which stretched almost for a decade.

== Club career ==
Dorji started to play for the renowned football club of India, Mohammedan Sporting Kolkata from 1980 and in 1982 in Calcutta Football League and won the league in 1981.

Dorji dawn with colours for various clubs including Mahendra Police Club of Nepal, Kolkata-giants East Bengal Club and Mohun Bagan AC alongside Food Corporation of India.

He was also an important part of the Sikkim football team during their Santosh Trophy campaigns.

== Personal life ==
Dorji was married to Pushpa Yonzon and the couple have two children Zennyla Bhutia and Marco Bhutia.

Dorji died at the age of 42. He was battling with cancer for long. An incurable disease took his last breath in a nursing home in Calcutta, on 18 October 2001.

== International career ==
Dorji became the first Sikkimese to captain the India national team in the Pre-Olympic tournament held in Malaysia. Gradually, Dorji represented India in various International matches. He played at the Chinese Great Wall Cup in 1984, and won the prestigious medal for the country.

He later represented India at the South Asian Football Federation Games and further played the famous AFC Asian Cup at Abu Dhabi, United Arab Emirates in 1988. Dorji represented India in the Jawaharlal Nehru Gold Cup in 1983, 1984, 1985, 1987, and 1988 alongside Bangladesh President's Gold Cup at Dhaka in 1983, 1984 and 1987.

== Honours ==
Mohammedan Sporting

- Calcutta Football League: 1981
- Rovers Cup: 1980; runner-up 1981, 1982
- Federation Cup runner-up: 1981–82
- IFA Shield runner-up: 1982
- DCM Trophy runner-up: 1982

== See also ==
- List of Indian football players in foreign leagues
- List of India national football team captains

== Bibliography ==
- Kapadia, Novy (2017). Barefoot to Boots: The Many Lives of Indian Football. Penguin Random House. ISBN 978-0-143-42641-7.
- Martinez, Dolores; Mukharjiim, Projit B (2009). Football: From England to the World: The Many Lives of Indian Football. Routledge. ISBN 978-1-138-88353-6. Archived from the original on 2 July 2022.
- Nath, Nirmal (2011). History of Indian Football: Upto 2009–10. Readers Service. ISBN 9788187891963. Archived from the original on 22 July 2022.
- Dineo, Paul; Mills, James (2001). Soccer in South Asia: Empire, Nation, Diaspora. London, United Kingdom: Frank Cass Publishers. ISBN 978-0-7146-8170-2. Archived from the original on 25 July 2022.
- Majumdar, Boria; Bandyopadhyay, Kausik (2006). A Social History Of Indian Football: Striving To Score. Routledge. ISBN 9780415348355. Archived from the original on 29 June 2021.
- Basu, Jaydeep (2003). Stories from Indian Football. UBS Publishers' Distributors. ISBN 9788174764546. Archived from the original on 11 October 2022.
