= SSV Glött =

German football club

- Full name: Spiel und Sportvereinigung 1949 Glött e.V.
- Founded: 28 May 1949
- Ground: Sportzentrum Glött
- Chairman: Florian Strehle
- Manager: Alexander Kuchenbaur
- League: Bezirksliga Schwaben-Nord (VII)
- 2015–16: Kreisliga Schwaben-West (VIII), 1st (promoted)
Home colours	Away colours

The SSV Glött is a German association football club from the town of Glött, Bavaria.

The club spent almost its entire history as an amateur side in the leagues of the Schwaben football league system. Glött's most notable moment came in 1978 when, after having won the Schwaben Cup and qualified for the first round of the DFB Pokal (German Cup), the team met FC Bayern Munich and lost 5–0 in front of 8,000 spectators in Gundelfingen.

Two years later, the side earned promotion to the tier-four Landesliga Bayern-Süd but lasted for only one season at this level and has remained within the leagues of Schwaben ever since.

== History ==
The SSV Glött was formed on 28 May 1949 and entered league football in the following year. In 1951, the club was granted permission to adopt the crest of the Fugger as its club logo, Glött having once been one of the territories owned by the trading family.

The club did not make it out of the bottom two divisions of local league football until 1975, followed by a title in the A-Klasse in 1977 that granted the side entry to the tier-five Bezirksliga.

The club's greatest moment came when it won the Schwaben Cup for the first and only time by beating SV Ober-Germaringen 6–4 on penalties in Lauingen. The side then qualified for the first round of the German Cup and played its home game at near-by Gundelfingen. Despite Glött's lowly league status, Bayern fielded a strong side against the amateurs, with players like Paul Breitner, Karl-Heinz Rummenigge and Gerd Müller in the team. Glött was 3–0 behind after 18 minutes but then managed to stem the tide and concede only two more goals, both through penalties. Bayern's lackluster performance in the cup match was heavily criticised in the newspapers the following day, especially in the face of coach Gyula Lóránt having demanded 20 goals to be scored against the amateurs.

Two years later, the team enjoyed another successful season, crowned with a championship in the tier-five Bezirksliga Schwaben-Nord and promotion to the Landesliga Bayern-Süd. In the Landesliga, Glött battled against relegation, finishing 14th in the end as the best-placed relegated side, but relegated nevertheless after losing 2–4 to SV Wacker Burghausen in the first relegation game.

When the Bezirksoberliga Schwaben was formed in 1988, Glött did not qualify for the league but played at Bezirksliga level instead. The early 1990s saw the club as a permanent relegation struggler, and eventually dropped down to the A-Klasse Schwaben-Nord in 1993.

They made a return to the Bezirksliga in 1995, spending the first three seasons battling relegation again before a second-place finish in 1999 meant promotion to the Bezirksoberliga.

Glött's single season in the Bezirksoberliga was not a lucky one, as they won only five out of 32 games, finished second-last and were relegated again. Back in the Bezirksliga, the team gradually declined and was relegated back to the Kreisliga, the former A-Klasse, in 2003.

SSV Glött made an immediate return to the Bezirksliga in 2004, and initially earned better results than previous campaigns before once more falling to relegation in 2007. After this it took the club five seasons to return to the Bezirksliga, which it did after a league championship in 2012. The club suffered another relegation in 2014, back to the Kreisliga again but returned to the Bezirksliga in 2016.

== Honours ==
The club's honours:

=== League ===
- Bezirksliga Schwaben-Nord
  - Champions: 1980
  - Runners-up: 1999
- Kreisliga Schwaben-Nord
  - Champions: 1977, 1995, 2004
- Kreisliga Schwaben-West
  - Champions: 2012, 2016
  - Runners-up: 2008

=== Cup ===
- Schwaben Cup
  - Winners: 1978

== Recent seasons ==
The recent season-by-season performance of the club:

Season	Division	Tier	Position
1999–2000	Bezirksoberliga Schwaben	VI	16th ↓
2000–01	Bezirksliga Schwaben-Nord	VII	8th
2001–02	Bezirksliga Schwaben-Nord	VII	10th
2002–03	Bezirksliga Schwaben-Nord	VII	14th ↓
2003–04	Kreisliga Schwaben-Nord	VIII	1st ↑
2004–05	Bezirksliga Schwaben-Nord	VII	5th
2005–06	Bezirksliga Schwaben-Nord	VII	3rd
2006–07	Bezirksliga Schwaben-Nord	VII	14th ↓
2007–08	Kreisliga Schwaben-West	VIII	2nd
2008–09	Kreisliga Schwaben-West	IX	5th
2009–10	Kreisliga Schwaben-West	IX	7th
2010–11	Kreisliga Schwaben-West	IX	3rd
2011–12	Kreisliga Schwaben-West	IX	1st ↑
2012–13	Bezirksliga Schwaben-Nord	VII	7th
2013–14	Bezirksliga Schwaben-Nord	VII	14th ↓
2014–15	Kreisliga Schwaben-West	VIII	6th
2015–16	Kreisliga Schwaben-West	VIII	1st ↑
2016–17	Bezirksliga Schwaben-Nord	VII	

- With the introduction of the Bezirksoberligas in 1988 as the new fifth tier, below the Landesligas, all leagues below dropped one tier. With the introduction of the Regionalligas in 1994 and the 3. Liga in 2008 as the new third tier, below the 2. Bundesliga, all leagues below dropped one tier. With the establishment of the Regionalliga Bayern as the new fourth tier in Bavaria in 2012 the Bayernliga was split into a northern and a southern division, the number of Landesligas expanded from three to five and the Bezirksoberligas abolished. All leagues from the Bezirksligas onwards were elevated one tier.

↑ Promoted	↓ Relegated

== DFB Cup appearance ==
SSV Glött qualified for the first round of the German Cup just once:

Season	Round	Date	Home	Away	Result	Attendance
DFB-Pokal 1978–79	First round	5 August 1978	SSV Glött	FC Bayern Munich	0–5	8,000
