= Marco Küntzel =

German footballer

Personal information
- Date of birth: 22 January 1976 (age 50)
- Place of birth: Ludwigslust, East Germany
- Height: 1.78 m (5 ft 10 in)
- Position: Forward

Youth career
- 1981–1990: Empor Grabow
- 1990–1993: Hansa Rostock

Senior career*
Years	Team	Apps	(Gls)
1993–1995	Hansa Rostock	20	(3)
1995–1998	Union Berlin	94	(12)
1998–2001	SV Babelsberg 03	68	(28)
2001–2003	Borussia Mönchengladbach	16	(1)
2003–2006	Arminia Bielefeld	68	(10)
2006–2008	Energie Cottbus	16	(0)
2008–2009	FC Augsburg	20	(1)
Total		302	(59)

Managerial career
- 2010: FC Pipinsried
- 2011–2012: FC Augsburg U19 (assistant)
- 2012–2014: BC Aichach
- 2014–2015: FC Affing
- 2016: FC Königsbrunn U17
- 2018: Schwaben Augsburg (assistant)
- 2018–2020: FV Illertissen
- 2020–: Carl Zeiss Jena U17
- * Club domestic league appearances and goals

Marco Küntzel (born 22 January 1976 in Ludwigslust) is a German former professional footballer who played as a forward.

== International career ==
He represented Germany at the 1995 FIFA World Youth Championship.
