= Swabian football league system =

- Country: Bavaria
- Sport: Association football
- Promotion and relegation: Yes

National system
- Federation: Bavarian Football Association
- Confederation: UEFA
- Top division: Regionalliga Bayern
- Second division: Bayernliga Süd
- Cup competition: Schwaben Cup

The Swabian football league system is a league system operating in the Bavarian Regierungsbezirk of Swabia (German: Schwaben).

== Overview ==
The Swabian football league system operates within the Bavarian and German football league systems. The highest league in Swabia was, from 1988 to 2012, the Bezirksoberliga Schwaben, in its final years the seventh tier of the German football league system. Until the 3. Liga was introduced in 2008, was the sixth tier of the league system, until the introduction of the Regionalligas in 1994 the fifth tier.

The league system in Swabia currently consists of five tiers, these being:

- Bezirksliga (VII), in two groups
- Kreisliga (VIII), in six groups
- Kreisklasse (IX), in thirteen groups
- A-Klasse (X), in thirteen groups
- B-Klasse (XI), in twenty-one groups

Unlike most other parts of Germany, Swabia does not allow all reserve teams to take part in the main league system. Reserve teams from clubs in the Kreisliga and below play in separate, parallel leagues without promotion or relegation. A reserve side can only enter the main league system when the first team gains entry to the Bezirksliga. When a first team is relegated back down from the Bezirksliga, the second team has to leave the main system again.

Clubs in the B-Klasse do not suffer relegation as there is no league below, it is the bottom of the league pyramid in Swabia.

In the other regions of Germany, where reserve sides are fully integrated, there is further leagues below the B-Klasse, usually the C-Klasse. In some areas there can also be a D and E-Klasse, like in Berlin.

The Swabian league system is home to some clubs not actually based in Swabia. The best known of those clubs, all from the western part of Upper Bavaria, are the FC Pipinsried and the TSV Landsberg.

In turn, some clubs from the very west of Swabia chose to play in the Württemberg league system, most successful of those are the SpVgg Au/Iller, FV Illertissen and the SpVgg Lindau. All up, 75 clubs from Swabia play in the Württemberg league system, 45 of those in the Donau/Iller region, the remainder spread over other border regions of the WFV. In late 2010, the idea was floated that those clubs could be forced to return to the Bavarian league system but this idea was dropped again. The Swabian league system also accommodates one club from Austria, the SV Kleinwalsertal, which plays in the A-Klasse Allgäu 4 since 2016–17.

With the league reform at the end of the 2011–12 season, which included an expansion of the number of Landesligas from three to five, the Bezirksoberligas were disbanded. Instead, the Bezirksligas took the place of the Bezirksoberligas once more at the level below the Landesligas.

== The league system ==
The league system from the 2014–15 season:

Level	League(s)/Division(s)					
I	Bundesliga; 18 clubs					
II	2nd Bundesliga ^{‡} 18 clubs					
III	3. Liga ^{‡}; 20 clubs					
IV	Regionalliga Bayern; 18 clubs					
V	Bayernliga Süd; 19 clubs					
VI	Landesliga Bayern-Südwest; 18 clubs					
VII	Bezirksliga Nord; 16 clubs			Bezirksliga Süd; 16 clubs		
VIII	Kreisliga West	Kreisliga North	Kreisliga East	Kreisliga Augsburg	Kreisliga Central	Kreisliga South
IX	Kreisklasse West I Kreisklasse West II	Kreisklasse North I Kreisklasse North II	Kreisklasse Aichach; Kreisklasse Neuburg	Kreisklasse Augsburg-Northwest; Kreisklasse Augsburg-Central; Kreisklasse Augsburg-South	Kreisklasse Allgäu I Kreisklasse Allgäu II	Kreisklasse Allgäu III; Kreisklasse Allgäu IV
X	A-Klasse West I A-Klasse West II; A-Klasse West III	A-Klasse Nord	A-Klasse Aichach; A-Klasse Neuburg	A-Klasse Augsburg-Northwest; A-Klasse Augsburg-Central; A-Klasse Augsburg-Southwest	A-Klasse Allgäu I	A-Klasse Allgäu II; A-Klasse Allgäu III; A-Klasse Allgäu IV
XI	B-Klasse West I B-Klasse West II; B-Klasse West III; B-Klasse West IV	B-Klasse Nord	B-Klasse Aichach; B-Klasse Neuburg	B-Klasse Augsburg-Northwest; B-Klasse Augsburg-Central; B-Klasse Augsburg-South; B-Klasse Augsburg-Southeast; B-Klasse Augsburg-West	B-Klasse Allgäu I B-Klasse Allgäu II	B-Klasse Allgäu III; B-Klasse Allgäu IV; B-Klasse Allgäu V B-Klasse Allgäu VI; B-Klasse Allgäu VII; B-Klasse Allgäu VIII; B-Klasse Allgäu IX; B-Klasse Allgäu X B-Klasse Allgäu XI

Denotes parts of league system above Swabian level.

- All leagues on same level run parallel.
- ^{‡} Denotes league without clubs from Swabia since 2012–13.

== Recent changes ==
In 1998, the Bavarian FA renamed the three lowest football leagues:

- A-Klasse became Kreisliga
- B-Klasse became Kreisklasse
- C-Klasse became A-Klasse

Additionally, in some of the seven Bezirke, two new lowest levels were introduced and named B and C-Klasse. Initially, only Oberbayern introduced both of this new levels.

In 2010, Swabia introduced the B-Klasse, disbanding the A-Klasse for a season in the process to make adjustments to the league system. The following season, A-Klasses were reintroduced.

== Schwaben Cup ==
Annually since 1947, the Swabian FA, like the other six Bavarian FA's, staged a cup competition, the Schwaben Cup, open to all senior teams from the Swabian league system and Swabian clubs up to the Regionalliga. The winner of this competition was qualified for the Bavarian Cup. Through this competition, the winner and runners-up in turn gain entry to the German Cup. The record number of wins is held by FC Augsburg which won its thirteenth title in 2005. The competition went defunct in 2009.
