= VfR Neuburg =

German football club

- Full name: Verein für Rasenpiele Neuburg 1926 e. V.
- Founded: 1926
- Ground: VfR-Gelände
- Chairman: Peter Claus
- Manager: Christian Krzyzanowski
- League: Bezirksliga Schwaben-Nord (VII)
- 2015–16: Kreisliga Schwaben-Ost (VIII), 1st (promoted)
Home colours	Away colours

The VfR Neuburg is a German association football club from the town of Neuburg an der Donau, Bavaria.

The club's greatest success was its five seasons spend in the Fußball-Bayernliga from 1975 to 1980, with a seventh-place finish in 1976–77 as its best result.

== History ==
The club was formed on 11 May 1926. The club did not achieve any notable successes in the era before the Second World War but became a force in local football in the time after. It fluctuated between the tier four A-Klasse, now the Kreisliga, and the 2nd Amateurliga Oberbayern-Nord above until the later league was abolished in 1963.

VfR was a founding member of the Bezirksliga Oberbayern-Nord in 1963 and spend its days as a mid-table side until 1971, when it won the league and earned promotion to the tier four Landesliga Bayern-Süd. The club did well from the start in its new league, coming eighth in its first season and third in the next two, followed by a league championship and promotion in 1970–71.

VfR entered the Bayernliga in 1975, coming 15th in its first year there. It avoided relegation by only two points. The next season was much better, the side coming seventh, but 1977–78 saw the team struggle once more. Neuburg finished equal 13th with FC Herzogenaurach and SpVgg Büchenbach and had to play a series of deciders to determine the 15th place team, which would be relegated. VfR made a bad start, losing 1–0 to Herzogenaurach. Herzogenaurach then lost 2–0 to Büchenbach, which thereby earned the 13th place. This also meant VfR and Herzogenaurach had to play each other one more time to determine who would be relegated and this time VfR won 1–0, thereby remaining in the league while FCH went down.

VfR's form was marginally better in 1978–79, when it came 12th and was four points clear of a relegation rank. In 1979–80 however the team finished second-last and was one of four teams relegated, having finished two points short of a non-relegation spot.

The team initially still performed well when returning to the Landesliga, finishing seventh and fourth in its first two years back. In 1983 however the team came 16th and was relegated to the Bezirksliga. After two seasons there, finishing second and first, the club made a brief return to the Landesliga but was relegated for good after only two seasons, never to return to the league after 1987.

The side became a founding member of the Bezirksoberliga Oberbayern in 1988 and played there for the first five seasons of the league, coming third in 1990. In 1993 however, an 18th-place finish meant another relegation. After that, the club played as an upper table side in the Bezirksliga until 2001, when another promotion was achieved.

Back in the Bezirksoberliga for two seasons from 2001 to 2003, the side came seventh in its first year but was relegated for good after a 17th place in 2003. In 2003–04, the club was handed straight through the Bezirksliga and down to the Kreisliga after coming 15th in the league, dropping to this league level for the first time in over 40 years. After a year in the Kreisliga which ended in a league championship and promotion, the club made another return to the Bezirksliga Oberbayern-Nord, but was relegated once more after four seasons in 2009.

The club made the decision to leave the league system of Upper Bavaria and instead join the one of neighboring Bavarian Swabia, following the example of the majority of clubs from the Neuburg district, which already played there. The club entered the Kreisliga Schwaben-Ost, where it came second in 2010 and 2011 before winning a convincing league championship in 2011–12.

The club stayed in the Bezirksliga for only one season in 2012–13 before being relegated back down to the Kreisliga but made a return to the Bezirksliga in 2016.

== Honours ==
The club's honours:

=== League ===
- Landesliga Bayern-Süd
  - Champions: 1975
- Bezirksliga Oberbayern-Nord
  - Champions: 1971, 1985, 2001
  - Runners-up: 1984, 1996
- Kreisliga Donau Isar
  - Champions: 1961, 2005
- Kreisliga Ost
  - Champions: 2012
  - Runners-up: 2010, 2011, 2016

== Recent managers ==
Recent managers of the club:

Manager	Start	Finish
Peter Krzyanowski	?	6 May 2013
Naz Seitle	6 May 2013	16 April 2015
Alexander Egen	16 April 2015	30 June 2015
Christian Krzyzanowski	1 July 2015	Present

== Recent seasons ==
The recent season-by-season performance of the club:

Season	Division	Tier	Position
1999–2000	Bezirksliga Oberbayern-Nord	VII	
2000–01	Bezirksliga Oberbayern-Nord	VII	1st ↑
2001–02	Bezirksoberliga Oberbayern	VI	7th
2002–03	Bezirksoberliga Oberbayern	VI	17th ↓
2003–04	Bezirksliga Oberbayern-Nord	VII	15th ↓
2004–05	Kreisliga Donau Isar	VIII	1st ↑
2005–06	Bezirksliga Oberbayern-Nord	VII	11th
2006–07	Bezirksliga Oberbayern-Nord	VII	11th
2007–08	Bezirksliga Oberbayern-Nord	VII	9th
2008–09	Bezirksliga Oberbayern-Nord	VIII	14th ↓
2009–10	Kreisliga Ost	IX	2nd
2010–11	Kreisliga Ost	IX	2nd
2011–12	Kreisliga Ost	IX	1st ↑
2012–13	Bezirksliga Schwaben-Nord	VII	16th ↓
2013–14	Kreisliga Ost	VIII	5th
2014–15	Kreisliga Ost	VIII	3rd
2015–16	Kreisliga Ost	VIII	2nd ↑
2016–17	Bezirksliga Schwaben-Nord	VII	

- With the introduction of the Bezirksoberligas in 1988 as the new fifth tier, below the Landesligas, all leagues below dropped one tier. With the introduction of the Regionalligas in 1994 and the 3. Liga in 2008 as the new third tier, below the 2. Bundesliga, all leagues below dropped one tier. With the establishment of the Regionalliga Bayern as the new fourth tier in Bavaria in 2012 the Bayernliga was split into a northern and a southern division, the number of Landesligas expanded from three to five and the Bezirksoberligas abolished. All leagues from the Bezirksligas onwards were elevated one tier.

↑ Promoted	↓ Relegated
