= BC Aichach =

German football club

- Full name: Ballspiel-Club Aichach 1917 e.V.
- Founded: 1917
- Ground: BCA-Platz an der Schrobenhauser Straße
- Capacity: 3,000
- Chairman: Johannes Neumann
- Manager: Christian Seidel
- League: Kreisliga Schwaben-Ost (VIII)
- 2015–16: 11th
Home colours

The BC Aichach is a German association football club from the town of Aichach, Bavaria.

The club has been part of the Landesliga Bayern-Süd over most of the past five decades, playing 29 seasons there since 1963. Only TSV 1860 Rosenheim (36 seasons) and FC Gundelfingen (31 seasons) have spent more time in the league. In 1988, BCA won the Schwaben Cup, a qualifying competition for the German Cup, but failed to advance out of the preliminary rounds.

Aichach should not be confused another club out of Bavarian Swabia also commonly referred to as BCA, the now defunct side BC Augsburg, whose logo was very similar in appearance.

== History ==
The club was formed on 17 October 1917. Because of its connection to the Catholic church, BC was forced to merge with the gymnastics club TSV Aichach in 1933 by the Nazis who opposed faith-based and left-leaning workers' clubs. It regained its independence in 1945 following World War II.

BCA became a founding member of the new Landesliga Bayern-Süd (IV) in 1963 but was immediately relegated to the Bezirksliga. It took the club three seasons to return to this level, and they remained part of Landesliga play for nine seasons with their best results being a pair of fourth-place finishes. They dropped to the Bezirksliga again in 1977, but returned immediately to the Landesliga for another four seasons.

After being relegated in 1981, and dropping briefly to the A-Klasse level (VI), it took the side four seasons to return to the Landesliga for the 1985-85 campaign. A ten-year stint at this level followed in which BCA earned another three fourth-place finishes as its top results. The club dropped to the league below, now the Bezirksoberliga Schwaben (V), in 1995, but once more made an immediate return to the Landesliga. In 1998, the club won its only Schwaben Cup title, against FC Memmingen, in a drawn final. The rules of the competition, since changed, awarded BCA the cup as it played in a lower division than Memmingen and therefore only needed a draw to claim the win. In the 2000, the club slipped from Landesliga play and entered a period of decline.

Three consecutive relegations saw the club drop from the fifth tier Landesliga, passing through the Bezirksoberliga Schwaben (VI) and the Bezirksliga Schwaben-Nord (VII), on their way down to the Kreisliga Schwaben-Ost (VIII). The club reached a low point there in 2002–03, having to deregister its reserve team, but began climbing the ranks again in the following season. Two consecutive league championships returned BCA to the Bezirksoberliga, but they struggled there and were sent down in 2007. After a season in the Bezirksliga they again won their way to the Bezirksoberliga where they claimed the league title in 2011 and earned another promotion, this time to the Landesliga Bayern-Süd (VI).

The club aimed to qualify for the new southern division of the Fußball-Bayernliga, and planned to build a new stadium at the cost of Euro 2,2 million. Financial problems instead led to the cancellation of the project in March 2011. The recent rise of the club has been made possible through the sponsorship of current chairman Volker Weingartner.

In an unusual move, Weingartner dismissed coach Ivan Konjevic in April 2012 after a string of bad results and took on the role himself. Despite high ambitions, BCA finished in just eighth place, but was still able to take part in the promotion round for the new Regionalliga Bayern (IV) because FC Augsburg II was the only other Landesliga Bayern-Süd side to opt to apply for a Regionalliga licence and there were two promotion play-off spots were available. They managed to overcome Bayernliga (V) club TSV Großbardorf in the first round but were subsequently knocked out by Landesliga Nord (VI) champions Würzburger Kickers. Despite their failed Regionalliga attempt, BCA still earned promotion to the southern division of the Bayernliga (V).

The club aimed for another promotion in 2012–13 but came only third in the league. Because second placed Wacker Burghausen II was ineligible for the Regionalliga, the club qualified for the promotion round where it was defeated 5–2 on aggregate by FCA II, thereby remaining in the Bayernliga for another season. The club played a strong first half of the 2013–14 season, leading the league by 10 points at the winter break. However, in late January 2014 it was announced that the club's sponsor, chairman Volker Weingartner, would cease all payments. Apart from the possibility of losing players and the current coach, it also made it unlikely that the club would apply for a Regionalliga licence.

After seven years of financial support for the club Weingartner stepped down as chairman of BCA in April 2014. As a consequence the club did not apply for a Regionalliga licence for the following season. Instead, a withdrawal of the team from the Bayernliga to a lower division was discussed as most of the club's players were planning to leave the side at the end of the season. The club took out the championship in the Bayernliga Süd in 2013–14 but nevertheless opted to withdraw its team from the league with the possibility that the club would not field a senior football side in 2014–15 at all.

In June 2014 the club presented a new coach and chairman and declared that it would compete in the tier eight Kreisliga, the league its reserve team played in the previous season, in 2014–15.

== Honours ==
The club's honours:

=== League ===
- Bayernliga Süd
  - Champions: 2014
- Bezirksoberliga Schwaben
  - Champions: 1996, 2011
- Bezirksliga Schwaben-Nord
  - Champions: 1967, 1977, 1985, 2005, 2008
- Kreisliga Schwaben-Ost
  - Champions: 2004

=== Cup ===
- Schwaben Cup
  - Winners: 1998

== Recent seasons ==
The recent season-by-season performance of the club:

Season	Division	Tier	Position
1999–2000	Landesliga Bayern-Süd	V	17th ↓
2000–01	Bezirksoberliga Schwaben	VI	14th ↓
2001–02	Bezirksliga Schwaben-Nord	VII	14th ↓
2002–03	Kreisliga Schwaben-Ost	VIII	
2003–04	Kreisliga Schwaben-Ost	VIII	1st ↑
2004–05	Bezirksliga Schwaben-Nord	VII	1st ↑
2005–06	Bezirksoberliga Schwaben	VI	13th
2006–07	Bezirksoberliga Schwaben	VI	14th ↓
2007–08	Bezirksliga Schwaben-Nord	VII	1st ↑
2008–09	Bezirksoberliga Schwaben	VII	10th
2009–10	Bezirksoberliga Schwaben	VII	5th
2010–11	Bezirksoberliga Schwaben	VII	1st ↑
2011–12	Landesliga Bayern-Süd	VI	8th ↑
2012–13	Bayernliga Süd	V	3rd
2013–14	Bayernliga Süd	V	1st (withdrawn)
2014–15	Kreisliga Schwaben-Ost	VIII	9th
2015–16	Kreisliga Schwaben-Ost	VIII	11th
2016–17	Kreisliga Schwaben-Ost	VIII	

- With the introduction of the Bezirksoberligas in 1988 as the new fifth tier, below the Landesligas, all leagues below dropped one tier. With the introduction of the Regionalligas in 1994 and the 3. Liga in 2008 as the new third tier, below the 2. Bundesliga, all leagues below dropped one tier. With the establishment of the Regionalliga Bayern as the new fourth tier in Bavaria in 2012 the Bayernliga was split into a northern and a southern division, the number of Landesligas expanded from three to five and the Bezirksoberligas abolished. All leagues from the Bezirksligas onwards were elevated one tier.

↑ Promoted	↓ Relegated
