= TSV 1861 Nördlingen =

German football club

TSV Nördlingen
- Full name: TSV 1861 Nördlingen e. V.
- Founded: 1861
- Ground: Gerd-Müller-Stadion
- Capacity: 10,000
- Chairman: Helmut Beyschlag
- Manager: Daniel Kerscher
- League: Bayernliga Nord (V)
- 2025–26: Bayernliga Süd, 11th of 17

TSV 1861 Nördlingen is a German football club in the town of Nördlingen, Schwaben, formed in 1861. It plays its home games at the Gerd-Müller-Stadion which has a capacity of 10,000 spectators. Apart from football, the club offers 14 other sports departments, the most successful by far being the basketball-department which currently has a men's and women's team in the 2. Basketball Bundesliga (II).

== Basketball ==
The club has two very successful basketball teams, the men's team now named Giants Nördlingen and the women's WWK Donau-Ries Nördlingen. Both the men's and women's team played in the 2. Basketball Bundesliga in 2008. The women's team belonged to the Basketball-Bundesliga for many years from 1989 before voluntarily withdrawing to the second division. The men's team won the Basketball-Regionalliga South-East (III) in 2003 and played in the 2. Bundesliga-Süd (II) which now is called 2. Bundesliga Pro-A until 2008, when the team achieved promotion to the Basketball Bundesliga. Once before, in the 1972–73 season, did the team reach this level, to finish last out of eight teams in the southern group of the Bundesliga and to be imideatelly relegated.

The 2007–08 season was by far the most successful in the club's basketball history. Both the men's and women's senior teams won their league and earning promotion, with the women being especially dominant, winning 21 out of their 22 games, with a 63–72 defeat at home to ASC Theresianum Mainz being the only loss of the season. The men's team won the league championship on the strength of a 17-game winning streak, lasting until the end of the season. Both teams are eligible for Bundesliga promotion.

Men's seasons (selection):

- 1972–73 Bundesliga-Süd 8th (relegated)
- 2002–03 Regionalliga Südost 1st (promoted)
- 2003–04 2. Bundesliga-Süd 14th
- 2004–05 2. Bundesliga-Süd 10th
- 2005–06 2. Bundesliga-Süd 8th
- 2006–07 2. Bundesliga-Süd 9th
- 2007–08 2. Bundesliga Pro-A 1st (promoted)
- 2008–09 Basketball Bundesliga

Women's seasons (selection):

- 1987–88 2. Bundesliga-Süd 2nd
- 1988–89 2. Bundesliga-Süd 1st (promoted)
- 1989–90 Basketball Bundesliga 7th
- 1990–91 Basketball Bundesliga 10th
- 2007–08 2. Bundesliga-Süd 1st (promoted)
- 2008–09 Basketball Bundesliga

== Football ==
The club was promoted in 1959 to the 2. Amateurliga Schwaben (IV), where it spent the next three seasons until the reorganisation of German football in 1963. The TSV was grouped in the Bezirksliga Schwaben (V), which it managed to win in its first season, thanks to the goal scoring efforts of a young talent with the name of Gerd Müller. Promotion to the Landesliga Bayern-Süd (IV) was achieved and the club spent three seasons in the league until they were relegated back to the Bezirksliga Schwaben in 1967. The Bezirksliga Schwaben was split into a northern and a southern section in 1968 and the TSV entered the Bezirksliga Schwaben-Nord, where it stayed until 1974.

With the Bezirksliga championship in 1974, the club returned to the Landesliga once more and survived 11 seasons in the league until relegated once again in 1985, back to the Bezirksliga Nord. It began the golden age of the club with five top-four finishes in the Landesliga until 1979 its first Schwaben Cup win in 1981. After 1983, the club fell into decline. In 1988, the Bezirksoberliga Schwaben was introduced and TSV Nördlingen managed to qualify, remaining in this league till 1992. From 1992 till 1997 and again in 2002, the club played in the Landesliga Süd, in between were stints in the Bezirksoberliga.

In 2004, the club won another promotion to the Landesliga and remained in this league until the 2007–08 season, when relegation once more could not be avoided. At the end of the 2011–12 season the club qualified directly for the newly expanded Landesliga after finishing third in the Bezirksoberliga. The club's greatest success in the Landesliga came in 2013–14 when it finished runners-up in the league but missed out on promotion in the promotion round.

The club's youth teams are traditionally quite strong; its under-19 side (German:A-Junioren) played in the Bayernliga-Süd, the highest level in Bavaria. Before the introduction of the Under 19 Bundesliga and Regionalliga the TSV used to face the youth sides of FC Bayern and TSV 1860 Munich in the Bayernliga-Süd.

The TSV 1861 Nördlingen played for almost 50 years either in the Landesliga Süd or the highest Schwaben league, be this the Bezirksliga, Bezirksoberliga or 2. Amateurliga.

The club does not have a true local rival as no other club in the Donau-Ries Kreis had similar success. In the early 2000s the TSV Wemding, based approximately 15 km away, spent a few seasons in the Bezirksoberliga with the TSV and this local derby attracted reasonable crowds.

== Famous player ==
Gerd Müller, born in Nördlingen, played in his early days for the club, until 1964, when FC Bayern Munich signed him. Even then his goal scoring abilities were already very visible with 50 goals scored in his last season with Nördlingen.

== Stadium ==
The club plays its home games at the Gerd-Müller-Stadion. The stadium was renamed in honor of him on 19 July 2008. Until then, it carried the name Rieser Sportpark.

== Honours ==
The club's honours:

=== League ===
- Landesliga Bayern-Südwest (VI)
  - Runners-up: 2014
- Bezirksliga Schwaben (V)
  - Champions: 1964
- Bezirksoberliga Schwaben (V-VI)
  - Champions: (2) 1992, 2001
- Bezirksliga Schwaben-Nord (V)
  - Champions: 1974

=== Cup ===
- Schwaben Cup
  - Winners: (3) 1981, 1989, 2007
  - Runners-up: (3) 1982, 1990, 2003

=== Indoor ===
- Schwaben indoor football championship
  - Winners: 1996

=== Youth ===
- Bavarian Under 15 championship
  - Runners-up: 1990

== Recent seasons ==
The recent season-by-season performance of the club:

Season	Division	Tier	Position
1963–64	Bezirksliga Schwaben	V	1st ↑
1964–65	Landesliga Bayern-Süd	IV	12th
1965–66	Landesliga Bayern-Süd	IV	13th
1966–67	Landesliga Bayern-Süd	IV	14th ↓
1967–68	Bezirksliga Schwaben	V	5th
1968–69	Bezirksliga Schwaben-Nord	V	6th
1969–70	Bezirksliga Schwaben-Nord	V	4th
1970–71	Bezirksliga Schwaben-Nord	V	5th
1971–72	Bezirksliga Schwaben-Nord	V	14th
1972–73	Bezirksliga Schwaben-Nord	V	10th
1973–74	Bezirksliga Schwaben-Nord	V	1st ↑
1974–75	Landesliga Bayern-Süd	IV	4th
1975–76	Landesliga Bayern-Süd	IV	3rd
1976–77	Landesliga Bayern-Süd	IV	4th
1977–78	Landesliga Bayern-Süd	IV	3rd
1978–79	Landesliga Bayern-Süd	IV	4th
1979–80	Landesliga Bayern-Süd	IV	12th
1980–81	Landesliga Bayern-Süd	IV	9th
1981–82	Landesliga Bayern-Süd	IV	9th
1982–83	Landesliga Bayern-Süd	IV	6th
1983–84	Landesliga Bayern-Süd	IV	11th
1984–85	Landesliga Bayern-Süd	IV	16th ↓
1985–86	Bezirksliga Schwaben-Nord	V	
1986–87	Bezirksliga Schwaben-Nord	V	
1987–88	Bezirksliga Schwaben-Nord	V	
1988–89	Bezirksoberliga Schwaben	V	3rd
1989–90	Bezirksoberliga Schwaben	V	3rd

Season	Division	Tier	Position
1990–91	Bezirksoberliga Schwaben	V	4th
1991–92	Bezirksoberliga Schwaben	V	1st ↑
1992–93	Landesliga Bayern-Süd	IV	9th
1993–94	Landesliga Bayern-Süd	IV	6th
1994–95	Landesliga Bayern-Süd	V	12th
1995–96	Landesliga Bayern-Süd	V	14th
1996–97	Landesliga Bayern-Süd	V	16th ↓
1997–98	Bezirksoberliga Schwaben	VI	11th
1998–99	Bezirksoberliga Schwaben	VI	4th
1999–2000	Bezirksoberliga Schwaben	VI	9th
2000–01	Bezirksoberliga Schwaben	VI	1st ↑
2001–02	Landesliga Bayern-Süd	V	17th ↓
2002–03	Bezirksoberliga Schwaben	VI	5th
2003–04	Bezirksoberliga Schwaben	VI	3rd ↑
2004–05	Landesliga Bayern-Süd	V	14th
2005–06	Landesliga Bayern-Süd	V	14th
2006–07	Landesliga Bayern-Süd	V	8th
2007–08	Landesliga Bayern-Süd	V	17th ↓
2008–09	Bezirksoberliga Schwaben	VII	4th
2009–10	Bezirksoberliga Schwaben	VII	8th
2010–11	Bezirksoberliga Schwaben	VII	7th
2011–12	Bezirksoberliga Schwaben	VII	3rd ↑
2012–13	Landesliga Bayern-Südwest	VI	8th
2013–14	Landesliga Bayern-Südwest	VI	2nd
2014–15	Landesliga Bayern-Südwest	VI	5th
2015–16	Landesliga Bayern-Südwest	VI	3rd
2016–17	Landesliga Bayern-Südwest	VI	

- With the introduction of the Bezirksoberligas in 1988 as the new fifth tier, below the Landesligas, all leagues below dropped one tier. With the introduction of the Regionalligas in 1994 and the 3. Liga in 2008 as the new third tier, below the 2. Bundesliga, all leagues below dropped one tier. With the establishment of the Regionalliga Bayern as the new fourth tier in Bavaria in 2012 the Bayernliga was split into a northern and a southern division, the number of Landesligas expanded from three to five and the Bezirksoberligas abolished. All leagues from the Bezirksligas onwards were elevated one tier.

↑ Promoted	↓ Relegated

== DFB Cup appearances ==
The club has qualified for the first round of the German Cup just once:

Season	Round	Date	Home	Away	Result	Attendance
DFB-Pokal 1981–82	First round	28 August 1981	TSV 1861 Nördlingen	VfB Oldenburg	0–3	1,800

Source:"DFB-Pokal" (in German). Weltfussball.de.
