= Kreisliga Schwaben-West =

- Country: Germany
- State: Bavaria
- Number of clubs: 14
- Level on pyramid: Level 8
- Promotion to: Bezirksliga Süd
- Relegation to: Kreisklasse West I; Kreisklasse West II
- Current champions: TSV Ziemetshausen (2019–21)

The Kreisliga Schwaben-West is currently the eighth tier of the German football league system in the western region of the Bavarian Regierungsbezirk of Swabia (German: Schwaben). Until the disbanding of the Bezirksoberliga Schwaben in 2012 it was the ninth tier. From 2008, when the 3. Liga was introduced, was the eighth tier of the league system, until the introduction of the Regionalligas in 1994 the seventh tier.

== Overview ==
The winner of the Kreisliga Schwaben-West, like the winner of the Kreisliga Schwaben-Ost and the Kreisliga Schwaben-Nord, is directly promoted to the Bezirksliga Schwaben-Nord. The second placed teams out of those leagues and the 13th placed team out of the Bezirksliga play-off for the last spot there.

The teams relegated from the Kreisliga have to step down to the Kreisklasse. The Kreisliga Schwaben-West is fed by the Kreisklasses Schwaben-West 1 and Schwaben-West 2.

Until 1998, the Kreisliga West was called A-Klasse West. Until 2008, reserve teams of clubs in the league had to enter a parallel reserves division without promotion or relegation but have since been allowed to join the regular league system.

== League champions ==
The league champions since 1993 were:

Season	Club
1992–93	SC Biberbach
1993–94	SC Ichenhausen
1994–95	TSV Gersthofen
1995–96	FC Langweid
1996–97	FC Günzburg
1997–98	SSV Anhausen
1998–99	TSV Dinkelscherben
1999–2000	TSV Gersthofen
2000–01	TSV Krumbach
2001–02	SC Biberbach
2002–03	SC Altenmünster
2003–04	TSV Offingen
2004–05	SSV Anhausen
2005–06	TSG Thannhausen II

Season	Club
2006–07	Türk Gencler Birligi Günzburg
2007–08	VfR Jettingen
2008–09	TSV Krumbach
2009–10	SV Ettenbeuren
2010–11	SC Ichenhausen
2011–12	SSV Glött
2012–13	FC Lauingen
2013–14	FC Günzburg
2014–15	SV Mindelzell
2015–16	SSV Glött
2016–17	TSV Offingen
2017–18	TSG Thannhausen
2018–19	FC Günzburg
2019–21	TSV Ziemetshausen

== Current clubs ==
The clubs in the league in the 2021–22 season and their 2019–21 final positions:

Club	Position
FC Gundelfingen II	2nd
VfR Jettingen	3rd
SpVgg Wiesenbach	4th
TSV Offingen	5th
SpVgg Ellzee	6th
SV Mindelzell	7th
TSG Thannhausen	8th
SSV Glött	9th
FC Grün-Weiß Ichenhausen	10th
TG Birliği Günzburg	11th
SG Reisenburg-Leinheim	12th
FC Lauingen	13th
TSV Balzhausen	Promoted from the Kreisklasse
Türk Gücü Lauingen	Promoted from the Kreisklasse
