= FC Enikon Augsburg =

German football club

- Full name: FC Enikon Augsburg 1978
- Founded: 1978
- Dissolved: 1995
- League: Defunct
Home colours	Away colours

The FC Enikon Augsburg was a German football club from Augsburg, Bavaria that was active from the late 1970s until the mid-1990s.

== History ==
The club was formed in 1978 by Croatian migrants and languished in the lower leagues of the Schwaben football league system for most of its short existence. It climbed into higher-level competition through the financial support of Croatian construction company Enikon.

The team rose rapidly through the early 1990s, earning four consecutive promotions. A championship in the Bezirksliga Schwaben-Süd (VII) in 1992 advanced the side to the Bezirksoberliga Schwaben (VI). After finishing second there, they won promotion to the Landesliga Bayern-Süd (V) through the promotion play-off. Another second-place result and a successful promotion round with the other Landesliga runners-up gained the team entry to the Bayernliga (IV) for the 1994–95 season.

Enikon's primary objective was to one day play league games against the long established and well-known local side FC Augsburg. They narrowly missed that goal as FCA was promoted ahead of them to the Regionalliga Süd (III).

The club found competition in the Bayernliga to be more difficult and struggled for survival there. After a promising start in which Enikon won their first two matches of the season, the club quickly fell into the relegation zone. They finished in 16th place with a record of ten wins, nine draws and fifteen defeats and would have been immediately sent down if not for the withdrawal of 1. FC Amberg from the league allowing Enikon to take Amberg's spot in the relegation play-offs. They won their first round match over Alemannia Haibach (2:1), but were sent back down to Landesliga play after losing to SpVgg Weiden.

=== Disbanding of the club ===
As the club's Bayernliga campaign was coming to a close it became clear that sponsor Enikon could not continue its support and that without their financial backing the team could not afford to carry on in the upcoming season. The decision was made to withdraw and FC was disbanded after the 1994–95 season. A proposal to merge with TSG Augsburg to retain a Landesliga spot for an Augsburg team did not materialize as TSG were themselves struggling financially.

=== Legacy ===
Like many immigrant-based clubs in Germany, Enikon suffered from the lack of a home ground and training facilities throughout its existence, having to share facilities with other clubs in Augsburg.

The club was well recognized in the region for the technical skill of its players, who were mostly, but not exclusively, of Croatian origin. Support for this is found in the club's rapid rise, and its 1994 win in the Schwaben indoor football championship followed by a second-place result in the Bavarian championship. FC Enikon remains the most successful non-Turkish migrant club in Bavaria.

== Honours ==
The club's honours:

=== League ===
- Landesliga Bayern-Süd (IV)
  - Runners up: 1994
- Bezirksoberliga Schwaben (V)
  - Runners up: 1993
- Bezirksliga Schwaben-Süd (VI)
  - Champions: 1992

=== Indoor ===
- Bavarian indoor football championship
  - Runners up: 1994
- Schwaben indoor football championship
  - Champions: 1994
