= FC Augsburg II =

German football club

- Full name: Fußball-Club Augsburg 1907 e. V II
- Founded: 1969
- Ground: Rosenaustadion
- Capacity: 32,354
- Owners: Klaus Hofmann; David Blitzer (45%)
- Chairman: Markus Krapf
- Manager: Markus Feulner
- League: Regionalliga Bayern (IV)
- 2025–26: Regionalliga Bayern, 14th of 18
Home colours	Away colours	Third colours

FC Augsburg II is the reserve team of the German association football club FC Augsburg from the city of Augsburg, Bavaria, whose first team play in the Bundesliga.

The team, which has never played above the fourth tier, had its greatest success in 1977, when it won the local Schwaben Cup, qualified for the German Cup and reached the third round of the competition, going out to Hertha BSC Berlin.

The side plays as an under-23 team.

== History ==
The club's reserve side can trace its roots back to the pre-merger BC Augsburg Amateure, which had its greatest success when it played for a season in the southern division of the Amateurliga Bayern in 1962–63. A sixth place there allowed the side to qualify for the unified Bavarian league the following year but, along with the decline of the senior team, the reserve side got relegated too, finishing 17th.

In the post-merger era, the team disappeared into the lower amateur leagues after that but returned to the Landesliga Bayern-Süd in 1976, finishing runners-up in the league in its first season, now as FC Augsburg Amateure. By 1978 however, the side was relegated again, not to return to this level for a quarter of a decade. It did however take out the Schwaben Cup in 1977 and qualified for the first round of the 1977–78 German Cup. After away victories over second division side Arminia Hannover and fellow amateur club 1. FC Normannia Gmünd in the first two rounds, the team reached the third round, where it lost 0–4 to Hertha BSC Berlin. Incidentally, the senior team was knocked out in the same round, too, losing to TSV 1860 München.

After becoming a founding member of the Bezirksoberliga Schwaben in 1988, the team was withdrawn at the end of the season, disbanded altogether and not reformed for more than a decade.

After 2004 the side once more played in the Landesliga Bayern-Süd again, generally achieving good results but not managing another promotion, with a second place in 2012 as its best result. The team was one of two clubs in the league to apply for a licence in the new tier four Regionalliga Bayern. Taking part in the promotion play-off, FCA II advance past Bayernliga clubs SB/DJK Rosenheim and FC Schweinfurt 05 to play in the Regionalliga from 2012. The club was thereby also able to win promotion from the sixth tier to the fourth without playing in the fifth.

In the 2012–13 season the club had to struggle against relegation all season and beyond, having to defend its league place in the relegation round with the Bayernliga runners-up. In a two-leg play-off against BC Aichach FCA II defended its league place with an aggregate score of 5–2. The following season was much more successful for the team, finishing fourth in the Regionalliga. After two better seasons with a fourth place in 2014 as its best result Augsburg had to enter the relegation play-off once more in 2015–16 but successfully defended its league place against TSV 1860 Rosenheim.

== Current squad ==
As of 8 September 2026

Note: Flags indicate national team as defined under FIFA eligibility rules; some limited exceptions apply. Players may hold more than one non-FIFA nationality.

No.	Pos.	Nation	Player
1	GK	GER	Tobias Jäger
3	DF	GER	David Lichtenberger
4	DF	GER	Niklas Hummel
5	DF	GER	Junior Atemkeng
7	MF	GER	Kerim Yaman
8	MF	AUT	Loris Husic
9	FW	SRB	David Dreo
10	FW	JPN	Ryota Onoda
11	FW	GER	Aris Malaj
14	FW	GER	Kevin Nana
15	MF	TUR	Mahmut Küçükşahin
16	DF	GER	Devin Cömert

No.	Pos.	Nation	Player
17	MF	GER	Bentley Baxter Bahn
18	DF	GER	Jonas Ruf
19	DF	GER	Lukas Aigner
20	MF	GER	Pirmin Reinheimer
21	MF	GER	Nick Rasoulinia
22	GK	GER	Noah George
24	FW	LUX	David Jonathans
25	DF	GER	Simon Mühlbauer
27	MF	AUT	Florian Hangl
32	GK	GER	Timo Nagel
33	DF	GER	Till Schumacher

=== Out on loan ===
Note: Flags indicate national team as defined under FIFA eligibility rules; some limited exceptions apply. Players may hold more than one non-FIFA nationality.

No.	Pos.	Nation	Player
—	MF	GER	Franz Xaver Bleicher (at SG Sonnenhof Großaspach until 30 June 2027)

== Honours ==
The team's honours:

=== League ===
- Landesliga Bayern-Süd (IV)
  - Runners-up: 1977, 2012
- Bezirksoberliga Schwaben (VI)
  - Champions: 2004
- Bezirksliga Schwaben-Nord (V)
  - Champions: 1976
- Bezirksliga Schwaben-Süd (VII)
  - Champions: 2003

=== Cup ===
  - Schwaben Cup
    - Winners: 1977
    - Runners-up: (2) 1983, 2007

== Recent managers ==
Recent managers of the club:

Manager	Start	Finish
Roland Bahl	1 July 2004	31 December 2006
Thomas Tuchel	1 January 2007	30 June 2008
Roland Bahl	1 July 2008	30 June 2012
Dieter Märkle	1 July 2012	30 June 2015
Tobias Luderschmid	1 July 2015	10 November 2015
Manuel Baum	11 November 2015	31 December 2015
Christian Wörns	1 January 2016	6 August 2017
Dominik Reinhardt	25 August 2017	16 October 2018
Alexander Frankenberger	17 October 2018	6 January 2019
Josef Steinberger	7 January 2019	present

== Recent seasons ==
The recent season-by-season performance of the club:

Season	Division	Tier	Position
2002–03	Bezirksliga Schwaben-Süd	VII	1st ↑
2003–04	Bezirksoberliga Schwaben	VI	1st ↑
2004–05	Landesliga Bayern-Süd	V	10th
2005–06	Landesliga Bayern-Süd	V	5th
2006–07	Landesliga Bayern-Süd	V	4th
2007–08	Landesliga Bayern-Süd	V	4th
2008–09	Landesliga Bayern-Süd	VI	9th
2009–10	Landesliga Bayern-Süd	VI	3rd
2010–11	Landesliga Bayern-Süd	VI	5th
2011–12	Landesliga Bayern-Süd	VI	2nd ↑
2012–13	Regionalliga Bayern	IV	16th
2013–14	Regionalliga Bayern	IV	4th
2014–15	Regionalliga Bayern	IV	10th
2015–16	Regionalliga Bayern	IV	16th
2016–17	Regionalliga Bayern	IV	4th
2017–18	Regionalliga Bayern	IV	8th
2018–19	Regionalliga Bayern	IV	14th
2019–20	Regionalliga Bayern	IV	10th (Note: The 2019–20 Regionalliga season was ended early due to the coronavirus pandemic. As a result, FC Augsburg II concluded the league season in tenth place)

- With the introduction of the Bezirksoberligas in 1988 as the new fifth tier, below the Landesligas, all leagues below dropped one tier. With the introduction of the Regionalligas in 1994 and the 3. Liga in 2008 as the new third tier, below the 2. Bundesliga, all leagues below dropped one tier. With the establishment of the Regionalliga Bayern as the new fourth tier in Bavaria in 2012 the Bayernliga was split into a northern and a southern division, the number of Landesligas expanded from three to five and the Bezirksoberligas abolished. All leagues from the Bezirksligas onwards were elevated one tier.

=== Key ===
↑ Promoted	↓ Relegated

== DFB Cup appearances ==
The team has qualified for the first round of the German Cup just once:

Season	Round	Date	Home	Away	Result	Attendance
1977–78 DFB-Pokal	First round	29 June 1977	Arminia Hannover	FC Augsburg Amateure	0–1	2,200
1977–78 DFB-Pokal	Second round	20 August 1977	1. FC Normannia Gmünd	FC Augsburg Amateure	1–2	2,500
1977–78 DFB-Pokal	Third round	14 October 1977	FC Augsburg Amateure	Hertha BSC	0–4	4,000
