= Ivan Konjević =

Croatian footballer

Personal information
- Date of birth: 9 February 1971 (age 55)
- Place of birth: Novi Banovci, SFR Yugoslavia
- Height: 1.82 m (5 ft 11 1/2 in)
- Position: Defender

Youth career
- Partizan

Senior career*
Years	Team	Apps	(Gls)
–1994	Partizan	0	(0)
- → Teleoptik (loan)
–1994	→ Zemun (loan)		
1994–1996	SpVgg Ludwigsburg		
1996–1999	Rot-Weiß Oberhausen	25	(1)
1999–2001	Rot-Weiss Essen	32	(4)
2001–2004	FC Augsburg	33	(1)

Managerial career
- –2012: BC Aichach
- * Club domestic league appearances and goals

Ivan Konjević (born 9 February 1971) is a retired Croatian football defender.

== Club career ==
Born in Novi Banovci, back in SFR Yugoslavia, he begin playing in Serbia with FK Partizan which sent him on loan to their satellite club FK Teleoptik, and next to FK Zemun.

In 1994 he moved to Germany where in a decade from 1994 till 2004 he played with SpVgg Ludwigsburg, Rot-Weiß Oberhausen, Rot-Weiss Essen and FC Augsburg.
