= Kreisliga Schwaben-Nord =

- Country: Germany
- State: Bavaria
- Number of clubs: 14
- Level on pyramid: Level 8
- Promotion to: Bezirksliga Süd
- Relegation to: Kreisklasse Nord I; Kreisklasse Nord II
- Current champions: SV Wörnitzstein-Berg (2019–21)

The Kreisliga Schwaben-Nord is currently the eighth tier of the German football league system in the northern region of the Bavarian Regierungsbezirk of Swabia (German: Schwaben). Until the disbanding of the Bezirksoberliga Schwaben in 2012 it was the ninth tier. From 2008, when the 3. Liga was introduced, was the eighth tier of the league system, until the introduction of the Regionalligas in 1994 the seventh tier.

== Overview ==
The winner of the Kreisliga Schwaben-Nord, like the winner of the Kreisliga Schwaben-Ost and the Kreisliga Schwaben-West, is directly promoted to the Bezirksliga Schwaben-Nord. The second placed teams out of those leagues and the 13th placed team out of the Bezirksliga play-off for the last spot there.

The teams relegated from the Kreisliga have to step down to the Kreisklasse. Kreisliga Schwaben-Nord is fed by the Kreisklasses Schwaben-Nord I and Schwaben-Nord II.

Until 1998, the Kreisliga Nord was called A-Klasse Nord. Until 2010, reserve teams of clubs in the league had to enter a parallel reserves division without promotion or relegation but have since been allowed to join the regular league system.

== League champions ==
The league champions since the 1984–85 season were:

| Season | Club |
| 1984–85 | VfB Oberndorf |
| 1985–86 | TSV Rain am Lech |
| 1986–87 | SV Holzheim |
| 1987–88 | VSC Donauwörth |
| 1988–89 | TSV Bissingen |
| 1989–90 | TSV Wittislingen |
| 1990–91 | TSV Wemding |
| 1991–92 | VfB Oberndorf |
| 1992–93 | FC Gundelfingen II |
| 1993–94 | SV Schwörsheim |
| 1994–95 | SSV Glött |
| 1995–96 | FC Lauingen |
| 1996–97 | SpVgg Ederheim |
| 1997–98 | TSV Wertingen |
| 1998–99 | SpVgg Ederheim |
| 1999–2000 | SSV Höchstädt |
| 2000–01 | BC Schretzheim |
| 2001–02 | SV Holzkirchen |

| Season | Club |
| 2002–03 | VfB Oberndorf |
| 2003–04 | SSV Glött |
| 2004–05 | TSV Hainsfarth |
| 2005–06 | TSV Wertingen |
| 2006–07 | SpVgg Altisheim-Leitheim |
| 2007–08 | VfB Oberndorf |
| 2008–09 | TSV Oettingen |
| 2009–10 | FC Donauwörth |
| 2010–11 | TSV Wemding |
| 2011–12 | SV Donaumünster-Erl. |
| 2012–13 | SV Holzkirchen |
| 2013–14 | TSV Möttingen |
| 2014–15 | FC Lauingen |
| 2015–16 | FC Donauwörth ^{+} |
| 2016–17 | SV Donaumünster |
| 2017–18 | SV Holzkirchen |
| 2018–19 | FC Mertingen |
| 2019–21 | SV Wörnitzstein-Berg |

- ^{+} FC Donauwörth merged with SV Wörnitzstein-Berg at the end of the 2015–16 season, with the new club adopting the name of the latter.

== Current clubs ==
The clubs in the league in the 2021–22 season and their 2019–21 final positions:

| Club | Position |
|---|---|
| SV Holzkirchen | Relegated from the Bezirksliga |
| TSV Oettingen | 2nd |
| FSV Reimlingen | 3rd |
| SV Donaumünster | 4th |
| SV Kicklingen | 5th |
| TSV Möttingen | 6th |
| FC Maihingen | 7th |
| SpVgg Altisheim | 8th |
| SV Holzheim | 9th |
| FSV Marktoffingen | 10th |
| BC Schretzheim | 11th |
| TSV Hainsfarth | 12th |
| TSV Binswangen | Promoted from the Kreisklasse |
| TSV Wemding | Promoted from the Kreisklasse |
