= Landesliga Bayern-Süd =

- Founded: 1963
- Folded: 2012
- Country: Germany
- State: Bavaria
- Level on pyramid: Level 6
- Promotion to: Bayernliga
- Relegation to: Bezirksoberliga Oberbayern; Bezirksoberliga Schwaben
- Last champions: Wacker Burghausen II (2011–12)

The Landesliga Bayern-Süd (English: State League Bavaria-South) was the sixth tier of the German football league system in southern Bavaria. Until the introduction of the 3. Liga (Third League) in 2008, it was the fifth tier of the league system, until the introduction of the Regionalligas in 1994 the fourth tier.

The winner of the Landesliga Süd was automatically qualified for the Bayernliga, while the runners-up needed to compete with the runners-up of Landesliga Bayern-Mitte and Landesliga Bayern-Nord and the 15th-placed team of the Bayernliga for another promotion spot.

The league was disbanded in 2012, when the Regionalliga Bayern was introduced as the new fourth tier of the German league system in Bavaria. Below this league, the Bayernliga was expanded to two divisions while the number of state leagues grew from three to five divisions. However, none of the new leagues carried the name Landesliga Bayern-Süd, with the Landesliga Bayern-Südwest coming closest in territorial coverage.

== Overview ==
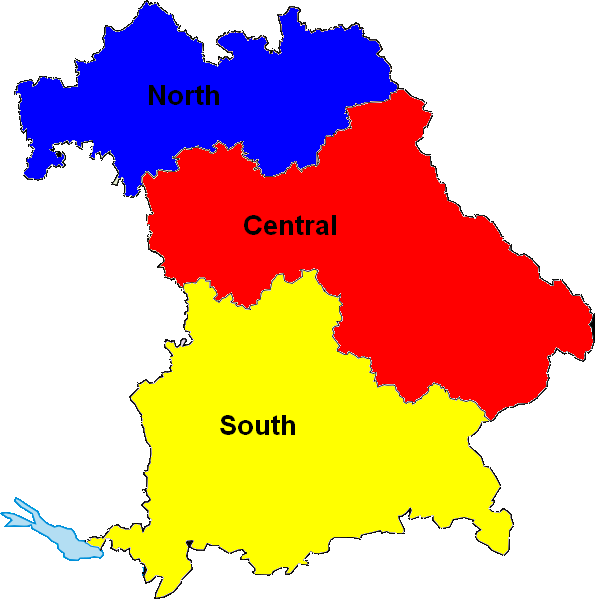
The Landesligas from 1963 to 2012.

The Landesligen in Bavaria were formed in 1963, in place of the 2nd Amateurligas, which operated below the Bayernliga until then. In the region of the Landesliga Süd, the 2nd Amateurligas were split into three groups, Schwaben, Oberbayern A and Oberbayern B. The league was formed from sixteen clubs, six of them from the Amateurliga Südbayern (III) and ten from the 2nd Amateurligas.

In the first eighteen seasons, up until 1980, only the league champions were promoted to the Bayernliga. This was altered in 1981, when the three Landesliga runners-up were given the opportunity to earn promotion, too, via a promotion round. The Bavarian football association actually stipulates in its rules and regulations that every league champion has to be promoted, unless it declines to do so, and every runners-up has to have the opportunity to earn promotion, too.

Below the league, the Bezirksligas were set as the fifth tier of league football, until 1988, when the Bezirksoberligas were formed. In the early years, three teams were promoted from the Bezirksligas, two from Oberbayern and one from Schwaben; from 1966, it was four clubs, two from each region. The Landesliga Süd is now fed by the two Bezirksoberligen of Schwaben and Oberbayern.

In the early years, the league operated with a strength of sixteen clubs, occasionally dropping to fifteen. From 1968, it was enlarged to eighteen. In 1981, TSV Schwaben Augsburg became the first club to be promoted from the Landesligas as a runners-up. Alongside, the number of clubs promoted to the league was increased to five. The league strength now became more fluctuating due to the unpredictability of promotion-relegation play-offs, and it moved between sixteen and nineteen clubs.

With the introduction of the Bezirksoberligas below it in 1988, the winner of those were automatically promoted, while the runners-up played-off for another promotion spot. The loser of this game then faced the 15th placed team of Landesliga to determine the winner of the last available spot in the Landesliga.

Clubs from the border region to Baden-Württemberg traditionally chose to play in the Baden-Württemberg Football League System rather than in the Bavarian Football League System. These so-called "Iller Vereine", after the river Iller who forms the boundary between the two states in this area, left the Schwaben FA in 1946. Notable clubs are the SpVgg Lindau, FV Illertissen and SpVgg Au/Iller. The later played in the Oberliga Baden-Württemberg on a number of occasions.

In the 1993–94 and 2007–08 season, two direct promotion spots to the Bayernliga were available, while the third placed team qualified for the promotion round. The MTV Ingolstadt and TSV Rain am Lech qualified through this process as the third team. The reason for this was changes in the German league system, the introduction of the Regionalliga in 1994 and the 3. Liga in 2008.

=== Disbanding ===
The Bavarian football federation carried out drastic changes to the league system at the end of the 2011–12 season. With the already decided introduction of the Regionalliga Bayern from 2012–13, it also placed two Bayernligas below the new league as the new fifth tier of the German league system. Below those, five Landesligas instead of the existing three were set, which would be geographically divided to limit travel and increase the number of local derbies.

The clubs from the Landesliga Bayern-Süd joined the following leagues:

- Champions and runners-up: Promotion round to the Regionalliga, winners to the Regionalliga, losers to the Bayernliga.
- Teams placed 3rd to 8th: Directly qualified to the Bayernliga.
- Teams placed 9th to 15th: Promotion round to the Bayernliga, winners to the Bayernliga, losers to the Landesliga.
- Teams placed 16th or worse: Directly qualified to the Landesliga.

== Founding members ==
When the league was formed in 1963 as the new fourth tier of the Bavarian league system in Upper Bavaria and Swabia, in place of the 2nd Amateurligas, it consisted of the following sixteen clubs from the following leagues:

- From the Amateurliga Südbayern
  - SpVgg Kaufbeuren
  - TSV Kottern
  - FC Kempten
  - FC Bayern Munich II
  - TSV 1860 Munich II
  - TSV Gersthofen
- From the 2nd Amateurliga Schwaben
  - Meringer SV
  - TSG Augsburg
  - FC Memmingen
  - TSV Kriegshaber
  - BC Aichach
- From the 2nd Amateurliga Oberbayern-A
  - TSV 1860 Rosenheim
  - FC Deisenhofen
  - FSV Pfaffenhofen
- From the 2nd Amateurliga Oberbayern-B
  - ASV Dachau
  - Sportfreunde Pasing

The clubs in the Amateurliga Südbayern placed seventh or better were admitted to the new Amateurliga Bayern, all others went to the new Landesligas. Schwaben had originally only four qualifying spots for its 2nd Amateurliga while Oberbayern had six, this was altered to a five each ratio. The top teams in each league were qualified. The two third placed teams in the two Oberbayern leagues had to play a decider, which Sportfreunde Pasing won 3–0 over FC Traunstein.

== Top-three of the Landesliga ==
The following teams have finished in the top-three in the league:

| **Season** | Champions | **Runners–up** | **Third** |
| 1963–64 | TSG Augsburg | SpVgg Kaufbeuren | Meringer SV |
| 1964–65 | SpVgg Kaufbeuren | TSV 1860 Munich II | TSV 1860 Rosenheim |
| 1965–66 | MTV Ingolstadt | TSV 1860 Rosenheim | FC Bayern Munich II |
| 1966–67 | FC Bayern Munich II | TSV 1860 Munich II | TSG Pasing |
| 1967–68 | SpVgg Kaufbeuren | MTV Ingolstadt | TSG Pasing |
| 1968–69 | MTV Ingolstadt | TSG Pasing | FC Memmingen |
| 1969–70 | FC Memmingen | TSG Augsburg | ASV Dachau |
| 1970–71 | SC Fürstenfeldbruck | BSC Sendling | Wacker Burghausen |
| 1971–72 | BSC Sendling | TSG Pasing | Wacker Burghausen |
| 1972–73 | FC Bayern Munich II | Wacker Burghausen | VfR Neuburg |
| 1973–74 | SpVgg Kaufbeuren | TSV 1860 Munich II | VfR Neuburg |
| 1974–75 | VfR Neuburg | TSG Augsburg | TSV Ottobrunn |
| 1975–76 | TSV 1860 Rosenheim | TSV Ottobrunn | TSV 1861 Nördlingen |
| 1976–77 | MTV Ingolstadt | FC Augsburg II | SpVgg Starnberg |
| 1977–78 | SB/DJK Rosenheim | SC Fürstenfeldbruck | TSV 1861 Nördlingen |
| 1978–79 | TSV Ampfing | SC Fürstenfeldbruck | BSK Olympia Neugablonz |
| 1979–80 | SC Fürstenfeldbruck | SB/DJK Rosenheim | TSV Schwaben Augsburg |
| 1980–81 | SpVgg Unterhaching | **TSV Schwaben Augsburg** | FC Wacker München |
| 1981–82 | FC Wacker München | TSV 1860 Munich II | SpVgg Kaufbeuren |
| 1982–83 | TSV Eching | TSV Aindling | SC Fürstenfeldbruck |
| 1983–84 | ESV Ingolstadt | Wacker Burghausen | TSV Aindling |
| 1984–85 | SC Fürstenfeldbruck | **TSV Eching** | TSV 1860 Rosenheim |
| 1985–86 | TSV Großhadern | FC Wacker München | TSG Augsburg |
| 1986–87 | FC Wacker München | **MTV Ingolstadt** | Türk Gücü München |
| 1987–88 | Türk Gücü München | **TSV Schwaben Augsburg** | SpVgg Starnberg |
| 1988–89 | SpVgg Starnberg | **FC Memmingen** | SV Lohhof |
| 1989–90 | TSV Eching | SV Lohhof | TSV Großhadern |
| 1990–91 | TSV Schwaben Augsburg | FC Gundelfingen | TSV Ampfing |
| 1991–92 | SpVgg Starnberg | FC Gundelfingen | TSV Königsbrunn |
| 1992–93 | Wacker Burghausen | **FC Gundelfingen** | Türk Gücü München |
| 1993–94 | SV Türk Gücü München | **FC Enikon Augsburg** | **MTV Ingolstadt** |
| 1994–95 | TSV 1860 Rosenheim | TSV Eching | TSV Schwaben Augsburg |
| 1995–96 | TSV 1860 Munich II | **TSV Aindling** | MTV Ingolstadt |
| 1996–97 | TSV 1860 Rosenheim | **TSV Landsberg** | MTV Ingolstadt |
| 1997–98 | TSV Schwaben Augsburg | Türk Gücü München | MTV Ingolstadt |
| 1998–99 | FC Kempten | TSV Bobingen | FC Ismaning |
| 1999–2000 | FC Ismaning | **MTV Ingolstadt** | SpVgg Unterhaching II |
| 2000–01 | SC Falke Markt Schwaben | **SpVgg Unterhaching II** | Eintracht Freising |
| 2001–02 | SC Fürstenfeldbruck | **TSV Schwaben Augsburg** | FC Gundelfingen |
| 2002–03 | FC Memmingen | SV Gendorf | MTV Ingolstadt |
| 2003–04 | MTV Ingolstadt | **BCF Wolfratshausen** | Wacker Burghausen II |
| 2004–05 | Wacker Burghausen II | **FC Kempten** | TSV Rain am Lech |
| 2005–06 | SV Heimstetten | TSG Thannhausen | TSV 1860 Rosenheim |
| 2006–07 | FC Kempten | **TSG Thannhausen** | TSV Rain am Lech |
| 2007–08 | TSV Buchbach | **FC Ingolstadt 04 II** | **TSV Rain am Lech** |
| 2008–09 | TSV 1860 Rosenheim | FC Affing | SV Pullach |
| 2009–10 | SV Heimstetten | VfB Eichstätt | FC Augsburg II |
| 2010–11 | SB/DJK Rosenheim | **TSV Gersthofen** | TSV Kottern |
| 2011–12 | Wacker Burghausen II | **FC Augsburg II** | **TSV Schwabmünchen** |

- Promoted teams in **bold**.
- The Bavarian football association requires deciders to be played when two teams are on equal points at the end of the season to determine promotion/relegation. Championship deciders were necessary in the following years:
- For first place:
  - 1979: TSV Ampfing defeated SC Fürstenfeldbruck.
  - 1983: TSV Eching defeated TSV Aindling.
  - 1995: TSV 1860 Rosenheim defeated TSV Eching 2–1.
  - 2004: MTV Ingolstadt defeated BCF Wolfratshausen 5–2.
  - 2010: SV Heimstetten defeated VfB Eichstätt 2–1.
- For second place:
  - none

=== Multiple winners ===
The following clubs have won the league more than once:

| **Club** | **Wins** | **Years** |
| MTV Ingolstadt | 4 | 1966, 1969, 1977, 2004 |
| SC Fürstenfeldbruck | 4 | 1971, 1980, 1985, 2002 |
| TSV 1860 Rosenheim | 4 | 1976, 1995, 1997, 2009 |
| SpVgg Kaufbeuren | 3 | 1965, 1968, 1974 |
| Wacker Burghausen II | 2 | 2005, 2012 |
| SB/DJK Rosenheim | 2 | 1978, 2011 |
| SV Heimstetten | 2 | 2006, 2010 |
| FC Kempten | 2 | 1999, 2007 |
| FC Memmingen | 2 | 1970, 2003 |
| TSV Schwaben Augsburg | 2 | 1991, 1998 |
| Türk Gücü München | 2 | 1988, 1994 |
| SpVgg Starnberg | 2 | 1989, 1992 |
| TSV Eching | 2 | 1983, 1990 |
| FC Wacker München | 2 | 1982, 1987 |
| FC Bayern Munich II | 2 | 1967, 1973 |

== All-time table 1963–2012 ==
In the all-time table of the league from its formation in 1963 to its disbanding in 2012, TSV 1860 Rosenheim is the clear leader, 388 points ahead of second placed FC Gundelfingen, with BC Aichach third. The last place, number 121, goes to SpVgg Günz-Lauben with only 12 points. The 121st and last-ever team to enter the league was the VfB Durach for the 2011–12 season.

The TSV 1860 Rosenheim holds the record for all three Landesligen with 1,833 points from 1,206 games in 36 seasons, of a possible 49 up to 2012, the final year of the league.

| Pos. | Club | Seasons | M | W | D | L | GF | GA | P |
|---|---|---|---|---|---|---|---|---|---|
| 1 | TSV 1860 Rosenheim | 36 | 1206 | 503 | 324 | 379 | 1991 | 1678 | 1833 |
| 2 | FC Gundelfingen | 31 | 1016 | 396 | 257 | 363 | 1685 | 1669 | 1445 |
| 3 | BC Aichach | 29 | 972 | 352 | 245 | 375 | 1660 | 1725 | 1310 |
| 4–118 | 115 clubs | | | | | | | | |
| 119 | VfB Durach | 1 | 34 | 4 | 5 | 25 | 31 | 76 | 17 |
| 120 | SK Srbija München | 1 | 34 | 3 | 6 | 25 | 34 | 85 | 15 |
| 121 | SpVgg Günz-Lauben | 1 | 34 | 3 | 3 | 28 | 32 | 104 | 12 |

== League placings since 1988–89 ==
The complete list of clubs and placings in the league since the 1988–89 season:

| Club | S | 89 | 90 | 91 | 92 | 93 | 94 | 95 | 96 | 97 | 98 | 99 | 00 | 01 | 02 | 03 | 04 | 05 | 06 | 07 | 08 | 09 | 10 | 11 | 12 |
|---|---|---|---|---|---|---|---|---|---|---|---|---|---|---|---|---|---|---|---|---|---|---|---|---|---|
| Wacker Burghausen | 23 | 6 | 5 | 4 | 8 | 1 | B | B | R | R | R | R | R | R | R | 2B | 2B | 2B | 2B | 2B | R | 3L | 3L | 3L | 3L |
| TSV 1860 München II ^{1} | 14 | | | | | | | | 1 | B | R | R | R | R | B | B | B | R | R | R | R | R | R | R | R |
| FC Memmingen | 8 | 2 | B | B | B | B | B | B | B | B | B | B | B | B | B | 1 | B | B | B | B | B | B | B | R | R |
| FC Ingolstadt 04 II ^{3} | 2 | | | | | | | | | | | | | | | | | | | 6 | 2 | B | B | B | R |
| TSV Aindling | 11 | 14 | | | | 7 | 15 | 6 | 2 | B | B | B | B | B | B | B | B | B | B | B | B | B | B | B | B |
| FC Ismaning | 4 | | | | | | | | | 8 | 4 | 3 | 1 | B | B | B | B | B | B | B | B | B | B | B | B |
| SpVgg Unterhaching II | 2 | | | | | | | | | | | | 3 | 2 | B | B | B | B | B | B | B | R | B | B | B |
| TSV Buchbach | 4 | | | | | | | | | | | | | | | | | 12 | 6 | 5 | 1 | B | B | B | B |
| TSV Rain am Lech | 13 | | | | | | | | | | 6 | 9 | 4 | 10 | 9 | 7 | 5 | 3 | 7 | 3 | 3 | B | B | B | B |
| TSV 1860 Rosenheim | 36 | 12 | 7 | 14 | 7 | 8 | 5 | 1 | B | 1 | B | 7 | 12 | 12 | 6 | 11 | 13 | 5 | 3 | 11 | 8 | 1 | B | B | B |
| SV Heimstetten | 5 | | | | | | | | | | | | | | | | 7 | 4 | 1 | B | B | 10 | 1 | B | B |
| SB/DJK Rosenheim | 9 | | | | | | | | | | | | | | | | | | | | 9 | 4 | 5 | 1 | B |
| TSV Gersthofen | 5 | | | | | | | | | | | | | | | | | | | | 15 | 12 | 13 | 2 | B |
| Wacker Burghausen II | 9 | | | | | | | | | | | | | | 13 | 10 | 3 | 1 | B | B | 6 | 5 | 6 | 15 | 1 |
| FC Augsburg II | 11 | | | | | | | | | | | | | | | | | 10 | 5 | 4 | 4 | 9 | 3 | 5 | 2 |
| TSV Schwabmünchen | 8 | | | | | | | | | | | | | 15 | | | 19 | | | | | 7 | 11 | 13 | 3 |
| VfB Eichstätt | 3 | | | | | | | | | | | | | | | | | | | | | | 2 | 14 | 4 |
| 1. FC Sonthofen | 4 | | | | | | | | | | | | | | | | | | | | 10 | 6 | 16 | | 5 |
| TSV Kottern | 9 | | | | | | 14 | 11 | 17 | | | | | | | 15 | | | 11 | 17 | | | | 3 | 6 |
| BCF Wolfratshausen | 9 | | | | | | | | | | | | | | | 5 | 2 | B | 4 | 13 | 7 | 8 | 8 | 10 | 7 |
| BC Aichach | 29 | 4 | 10 | 7 | 4 | 5 | 12 | 17 | | 5 | 11 | 15 | 17 | | | | | | | | | | | | 8 |
| SC Fürstenfeldbruck | 22 | 16 | | | | | 10 | 10 | 8 | 12 | 9 | 11 | 10 | 8 | 1 | B | B | B | B | B | 5 | 11 | 7 | 8 | 9 |
| TSV Landsberg | 17 | 11 | 15 | | | | | 4 | 10 | 2 | B | 18 | | | | | | | | | | | 12 | 7 | 10 |
| FC Pipinsried | 17 | | 14 | 11 | 12 | 16 | | | | | | | 15 | 9 | 5 | 9 | 16 | 11 | 8 | 12 | 12 | 14 | 15 | 11 | 11 |
| FC Unterföhring | 2 | | | | | | | | | | | | | | | | | | | | | | | 4 | 12 |
| FC Gundelfingen | 31 | 13 | 11 | 2 | 2 | 2 | B | B | B | B | 17 | | 7 | 6 | 3 | 17 | | | | | | | 14 | 9 | 13 |
| TSV Eching | 20 | 10 | 1 | B | B | B | 4 | 2 | 4 | 4 | 12 | 13 | 14 | 4 | 11 | 8 | 17 | 17 | | | | | 17 | | 14 |
| SV Pullach | 4 | | | | | | | | | | | | | | | | | | | | | 3 | 9 | 6 | 15 |
| SV Kirchanschöring | 2 | | | | | | | | | | | | | | | | | | | | | | | | 16 |
| VfB Durach | 1 | | | | | | | | | | | | | | | | | | | | | | | | 17 |
| TSG Thannhausen | 8 | | | 17 | | | | | | | | | | | 12 | 18 | | 9 | 2 | 2 | B | B | B | 12 | 18 |
| FC Affing | 6 | | | | | | | | | | | | | | | | | | 12 | 9 | 13 | 2 | 4 | 16 | |
| Falke Markt Schwaben | 16 | | | | | | | | | | | | | 1 | B | B | 4 | 6 | 13 | 10 | 16 | 13 | 10 | 17 | |
| FC Gerolfing | 1 | | | | | | | | | | | | | | | | | | | | | | | 18 | |
| TSV Großhadern | 18 | 7 | 3 | 12 | 13 | 15 | | 5 | 11 | 6 | 16 | 16 | | | | | | | 10 | 7 | 11 | 15 | 18 | | |
| SV Raisting | 3 | | | | | | | | | | | | | | | 16 | | | | | 14 | 16 | | | |
| FC Memmingen II | 1 | | | | | | | | | | | | | | | | | | | | | 18 | | | |
| FC Kempten | 25 | | | | | | | 7 | 15 | | 8 | 1 | B | B | 4 | 4 | 8 | 2 | B | 1 | B | 17 | | | |
| TSV 1861 Nördlingen | 24 | | | | | 9 | 6 | 12 | 14 | 16 | | | | | 17 | | | 14 | 14 | 8 | 17 | | | | |
| FC Königsbrunn | 15 | 5 | 9 | 8 | 3 | 14 | 7 | 8 | 9 | 18 | | | | 5 | 10 | 13 | 18 | | | 14 | 18 | | | | |
| SC Eintracht Freising | 13 | | | | | | | | | | | 10 | 6 | 3 | 8 | 6 | 11 | 8 | 9 | 15 | | | | | |
| TSV München-Grünwald | 6 | 8 | 13 | 9 | 16 | | | | | | | | 16 | | | | | | | 16 | | | | | |
| Schwaben Augsburg | 22 | B | B | 1 | B | 13 | 8 | 3 | 12 | 10 | 1 | B | B | B | 2 | B | 9 | 7 | 15 | 18 | | | | | |
| DJK Lechhausen | 7 | | | | | | | | 5 | 11 | 15 | 19 | | | | | 14 | 15 | 16 | | | | | | |
| FT Starnberg 09 ^{4} | 4 | | | | | | | | | | | | | | 16 | | 12 | 13 | 17 | | | | | | |
| SK Srbija München | 1 | | | | | | | | | | | | | | | | | | 18 | | | | | | |
| SC Bubesheim | 5 | | | | | | | | | | | | | 7 | 14 | 14 | 15 | 16 | | | | | | | |
| SC Fürstenfeldbruck II | 1 | | | | | | | | | | | | | | | | | 18 | | | | | | | |
| TSV Neusäss | 3 | | | | | | | | | | | | | | | 12 | 10 | 19 | | | | | | | |
| MTV Ingolstadt ^{3} | 15 | B | B | B | B | 4 | 3 | B | 3 | 3 | 3 | 8 | 2 | B | B | 3 | 1 | | | | | | | | |
| SV Gendorf ^{2} | 3 | | | | | | | | | | | | | | 7 | 2 | 6 | | | | | | | | |
| TSV Ampfing | 13 | B | 12 | 3 | 9 | 11 | 16 | 14 | 16 | | 5 | 4 | 5 | 11 | 15 | | | | | | | | | | |
| TSV Bobingen | 7 | | | | | | | | 7 | 13 | 10 | 2 | 9 | 14 | 18 | | | | | | | | | | |
| Türk SV München ^{6} | 11 | B | B | B | B | 3 | 1 | B | B | 7 | 2 | 5 | 11 | 13 | 19 | | | | | | | | | | |
| SV Lohhof | 4 | 3 | 2 | B | B | B | B | R | B | B | B | B | R | B | 20 | | | | | | | | | | |
| TSV Ebersberg | 1 | | | | | | | | | | | | | 16 | | | | | | | | | | | |
| FC Miesbach | 9 | | | | 14 | | 13 | 13 | 13 | 9 | 14 | 12 | 13 | 17 | | | | | | | | | | | |
| TuS Geretsried | 6 | | | | | | | 9 | 6 | 17 | | 6 | 8 | 18 | | | | | | | | | | | |
| TSV Mindelheim | 8 | | | | 11 | 17 | | | | 15 | 7 | 14 | 18 | | | | | | | | | | | | |
| SpVgg Kaufbeuren | 19 | | | | | | | 15 | | | | 17 | | | | | | | | | | | | | |
| FSV München | 3 | 17 | | 16 | | | | | | | 13 | | | | | | | | | | | | | | |
| 1. FC Garmisch | 6 | | | | | | | | | 14 | 18 | | | | | | | | | | | | | | |
| ESV Freilassing | 2 | | | 15 | | | | | 18 | | | | | | | | | | | | | | | | |
| FC Enikon Augsburg ^{5} | 1 | | | | | | 2 | B | | | | | | | | | | | | | | | | | |
| BSG Himolla Taufkirchen | 6 | | 8 | 10 | 6 | 10 | 11 | 16 | | | | | | | | | | | | | | | | | |
| TSV Dasing | 7 | | 4 | 5 | 10 | 6 | 9 | 18 | | | | | | | | | | | | | | | | | |
| ESV Ingolstadt ^{3} | 9 | 9 | 17 | | 5 | 12 | 17 | | | | | | | | | | | | | | | | | | |
| BSC Sendling | 5 | | | | | 18 | | | | | | | | | | | | | | | | | | | |
| SpVgg Starnberg ^{4} | 12 | 1 | B | 6 | 1 | | | | | | | | | | | | | | | | | | | | |
| FC Wacker München | 7 | B | 6 | 13 | 15 | | | | | | | | | | | | | | | | | | | | |
| MSV München | 1 | | 17 | | | | | | | | | | | | | | | | | | | | | | |
| VfL Günzburg | 1 | 15 | | | | | | | | | | | | | | | | | | | | | | | |

=== Key ===
| Symbol | Key |
|---|---|
| B | Bundesliga |
| RL 2B | Regionalliga Süd (1963–74): 2. Bundesliga (1974–present) |
| 3L | 3. Liga |
| R | Regionalliga Süd (1994–present) |
| B | Bayernliga |
| 1 | League champions |
| Place | League |
| Blank | Played at a league level below this league |

- S = No of seasons in league (as of 2011–12)

=== Notes ===
- ^{1} The TSV 1860 Munich II withdrew from the league in 1982 after the forced relegation of its first team to the Bayernliga.
- ^{2} The SV Gendorf Burgkirchen withdrew its team from the league in 2004.
- ^{3} The MTV Ingolstadt and ESV Ingolstadt merged in 2004 to form FC Ingolstadt 04.
- ^{4} The football departments of FT Starnberg 09 merged with SpVgg Starnberg to form FC Starnberg in 1992. In 2001, the FC Starnberg was dissolved and the football department re-joined FT Starnberg 09.
- ^{5} The FC Enikon Augsburg folded in 1995.
- ^{6} Türk Gücü München folded in 2001 and reformed as Türkischer SV 1975 München. In 2009, the club merged with SV Ataspor to form SV Türkgücü-Ataspor München.
- ^{7} The FSV München folded in 1999.

== League records 1963–2012 ==
The league records in regards to points, wins, losses and goals for and against the clubs in the league are:

| Record | Team | Season | Number |
|---|---|---|---|
| Most wins | SC Fürstenfeldbruck | 1984–85 | 28 |
| Fewest wins | FC Moosinning | 1971–72 | 1 |
| Fewest wins | TSV Marktoberdorf | 1978–79 | 1 |
| Fewest wins | TSV Kösching | 1979–80 | 1 |
| Fewest wins | TSV Schwaben Augsburg | 2006–07 | 1 |
| Most defeats | SpVgg Günz-Lauben | 1985–86 | 28 |
| Fewest defeats | SpVgg Unterhaching | 1980–81 | 1 |
| Most goals for | FC Wacker München | 1986–87 | 115 |
| Fewest goals for | TSV München-Grünwald | 1991–92 | 18 |
| Most goals against | SV Lohof | 2001–02 | 131 |
| Fewest goals against | FC Gundelfingen | 1991–92 | 18 |
| Highest points (2 for a win) | SC Fürstenfeldbruck | 1984–85 | 58 |
| Lowest points (2 for a win) | TSV Kottern | 1963–64 | 8 |
| Highest points (3 for a win) | SC Fürstenfeldbruck | 2001–02 | 83 |
| Lowest points (3 for a win) | TSV Schwaben Augsburg | 2006–07 | 7 |
