= Kreisliga Schwaben-Ost =

- Country: Germany
- State: Bavaria
- Number of clubs: 16
- Level on pyramid: Level 8
- Promotion to: Bezirksliga Süd
- Relegation to: Kreisklasse Neuburg; Kreisklasse Aichach
- Current champions: TSV Pöttmes (2019–21)

The Kreisliga Schwaben-Ost is currently the eighth tier of the German football league system in the eastern region of the Bavarian Regierungsbezirk of Swabia (German: Schwaben). Until the disbanding of the Bezirksoberliga Schwaben in 2012 it was the ninth tier. From 2008, when the 3. Liga was introduced, was the eighth tier of the league system, until the introduction of the Regionalligas in 1994 the seventh tier.

== Overview ==
The winner of the Kreisliga Schwaben-Ost, like the winner of the Kreisliga Schwaben-Nord and the Kreisliga Schwaben-West, is directly promoted to the Bezirksliga Schwaben-Nord. The second placed teams out of those leagues and the 13th placed team out of the Bezirksliga play-off for the last spot there.

The teams relegated from the Kreisliga have to step down to the Kreisklasse. The Kreisliga Schwaben-Ost is fed by the Kreisklasses Schwaben-Aichach and Schwaben-Neuburg. The majority of clubs in the Neuburg region and some of the Aichach region are actually geographically based in Upper Bavaria.

Until 1998, the Kreisliga Ost was called A-Klasse Ost. Until 2009, reserve teams of clubs in the league had to enter a parallel reserves division without promotion or relegation but have since been allowed to join the regular league system.

== League champions ==
The league champions since 1993 were:

Season	Club
1992–93	
1993–94	SV Münster
1994–95	FC Affing
1995–96	TSV Inchenhofen
1996–97	TSV Hilgertshausen
1997–98	TSV Dasing
1998–99	TSV Rehling
1999–2000	SV Münster
2000–01	SV Klingsmoos
2001–02	TSV Pöttmes
2002–03	TSV Aindling II
2003–04	BC Aichach
2004–05	DJK Langenmosen
2005–06	FC Schrobenhausen

Season	Club
2006–07	DJK Langenmosen
2007–08	TSV Meitingen
2008–09	TSV Burgheim
2009–10	SV Thierhaupten
2010–11	FC Stätzling
2011–12	VfR Neuburg
2012–13	FC Ehekirchen
2013–14	TSG Untermaxfeld
2014–15	BC Adelzhausen
2015–16	TSV Hollenbach
2016–17	VfL Ecknach
2017–18	FC Affing
2018–19	TSV Friedberg
2019–21	TSV Pöttmes

== Current clubs ==
The clubs in the league in the 2021–22 season and their 2019–21 final positions:

Club	Position
BC Adelzhausen	Relegated from the Bezirksliga
TSV Friedberg	Relegated from the Bezirksliga
TSV Rain am Lech II	Relegated from the Bezirksliga
BC Aichach	2nd
SC Griesbeckerzell	3rd
SSV Alsmoos-Petersdorf	4th
BC Rinnenthal	5th
TSV Burgheim	6th
SC Mühlried	7th
SV Thierhaupten	8th
TSG Untermaxfeld	9th
TSV Dasing	10th
DJK Langenmosen	11th
TSV Firnhaberau	12th
BC Aresing	Promoted from the Kreisklasse
FC Rennertshofen	Promoted from the Kreisklasse
