= FC Affing =

- Full name: Fußballclub Affing 1949 e. V.
- Founded: 1949
- Ground: Michael-Burger-Sportanlage
- Capacity: 3,000
- Chairman: Andreas Meier
- Manager: Tobias Jorsch & Matthias Schuster
- League: Kreisliga Schwaben-Ost(VIII)
- 2024–25: Kreisliga Schwaben-Ost (VIII),
Home colours

The FC Affing is a German association football club from the town of Affing, Bavaria.

The club's greatest success came in 2012 when it qualified for the new southern division of the expanded Bayernliga, the fifth tier of the German football league system.

== History ==
For most of its history the club has been a non-describt amateur side in local Bavarian football. The club won promotion to the Bezirksliga Schwaben-Nord for the first time in 1995, for just two seasons before being relegated again. Affing returned to the Bezirksliga in 1998 and finished just above the relegation ranks in its first season back. After two more seasons where the side narrowly escaped relegation Affing improved, culminating in a league championship in 2002–03 and promotion to the Bezirksoberliga Schwaben.

FC Affing quickly adapted to the new league, coming fourth in its first year there and second the following season, thereby earning promotion to the Landesliga Bayern-Süd. The club spent the next six seasons in the Landesliga, initially with mid-table finishes but, in 2008–09, FC Affing finished second. This performance qualified the club for the promotion round to the Bayernliga but it was knocked out by SV Seligenporten, losing 3–0.

Affing stayed in the Landesliga and came fourth the following year but had adifficult 2010–11 season, finishing 16th and being relegated. Back in the Bezirksoberliga the team took out the league championship in its first season back. Changes to the league system in Bavaria at the end of the 2011–12 season meant the unique opportunity for the Bezirksoberliga champions to earn promotion to the Bayernliga and Affing was successful at that, overcoming TSV Landsberg and FC Gundelfingen in the process. The club thereby moved from the seventh to the fifth tier in a season, bypassing the level in between.

In its inaugural season in the new southern division of the Bayernliga FC Affing finished eleventh. In October 2013 the club announced that it had to cut the salary of its players by up to 70 percent because of financial difficulties caused by an outstanding tax dept. Despite this the club was able to retain most of its players. Affing finished second-last in the league and was relegated after losing in the relegation round to DJK Vilzing. In the 2014–15 season, in the Landesliga, the club came second-last once more and dropped another level, now back to the Bezirksliga. The following season Affing was relegated again, now to the Kreisliga Schwaben-Ost.

== Honours ==
The club's honours:

=== League ===
- Landesliga Bayern-Süd
  - Runners-up: 2009
- Bezirksoberliga Schwaben
  - Champions: 2012
  - Runners-up: 2005
- Bezirksliga Schwaben-Nord
  - Champions: 2003
- Kreisliga Schwaben-Ost
  - Champions: 1995
  - Runners-up: 2017
  - Champions: 2018

== Recent seasons ==
The recent season-by-season performance of the club:

Season	Division	Tier	Position
1999–2000	Bezirksliga Schwaben-Nord	VII	10th
2000–01	Bezirksliga Schwaben-Nord	VII	12th
2001–02	Bezirksliga Schwaben-Nord	VII	5th
2002–03	Bezirksliga Schwaben-Nord	VII	1st ↑
2003–04	Bezirksoberliga Schwaben	VI	4th
2004–05	Bezirksoberliga Schwaben	VI	2nd ↑
2005–06	Landesliga Bayern-Süd	V	12th
2006–07	Landesliga Bayern-Süd	V	9th
2007–08	Landesliga Bayern-Süd	V	13th
2008–09	Landesliga Bayern-Süd	VI	2nd
2009–10	Landesliga Bayern-Süd	VI	4th
2010–11	Landesliga Bayern-Süd	VI	16th ↓
2011–12	Bezirksoberliga Schwaben	VII	1st ↑
2012–13	Bayernliga Süd	V	11th
2013–14	Bayernliga Süd	V	17th ↓
2014–15	Landesliga Bayern-Südwest	VI	17th ↓
2015–16	Bezirksliga Schwaben-Nord	VII	14th ↓
2016–17	Kreisliga Schwaben-Ost	VIII	2ND
2017–18	Kreisliga Schwaben-Ost	VIII	1st ↑
2018–19	Bezirksliga Schwaben-Nord	VII	9th
2019–21	Bezirksliga Schwaben-Nord	VII	14th
2021–22	Bezirksliga Schwaben-Nord	VII	9th
2022–23	Bezirksliga Schwaben-Nord	VII	15th ↓
2023–24	Kreisliga Schwaben-Ost	VIII	3rd

- With the introduction of the Bezirksoberligas in 1988 as the new fifth tier, below the Landesligas, all leagues below dropped one tier. With the introduction of the Regionalligas in 1994 and the 3. Liga in 2008 as the new third tier, below the 2. Bundesliga, all leagues below dropped one tier. With the establishment of the Regionalliga Bayern as the new fourth tier in Bavaria in 2012 the Bayernliga was split into a northern and a southern division, the number of Landesligas expanded from three to five and the Bezirksoberligas abolished. All leagues from the Bezirksligas onwards were elevated one tier.

↑ Promoted	↓ Relegated
