= Bezirksliga Schwaben-Nord =

- Founded: 1963
- Country: Germany
- State: Bavaria
- Number of clubs: 16
- Level on pyramid: Level 7
- Promotion to: Landesliga Südwest
- Relegation to: Kreisliga Nord; Kreisliga Ost; Kreisliga West
- Current champions: TSV Gersthofen (2019–21)

The Bezirksliga Schwaben-Nord is currently the seventh tier of the German football league system in the northern half of the Bavarian Regierungsbezirk of Swabia (German: Schwaben). Until the disbanding of the Bezirksoberliga Schwaben in 2012 it was the eighth tier. From 2008, when the 3. Liga was introduced, was the seventh tier of the league system, until the introduction of the Regionalligas in 1994 the sixth tier. From the leagues interception in 1968 to the introduction of the Bezirksoberliga in 1988 it was the fifth tier.

== Overview ==
Before the Bezirksoberligas in Bavaria were introduced in 1988 the Bezirksligas were the leagues set right below the Landesligas Bayern in the football pyramid. From 1963 to 1968 the Bezirksliga Schwaben was played in one single division, in 1968 it was split in a northern and a southern division. For the purpose of administration, the two leagues are still seen as one and teams can be shifted between the two-halves at the end of season.

The winner of the Bezirksliga Schwaben-Nord, like the winner of the Bezirksliga Schwaben-Süd, is now directly promoted to the Landesliga Bayern-Südwest. From 1968 to 1988, the league champions were promoted to the Landesliga Bayern-Süd, from 1988 to 2011 to the Bezirksoberliga Schwaben. In the later years of the league the runners-up were also given the opportunity to earn promotion by playing a promotion round with the runners-up of the southern division and the three Bezirksligas from Upper Bavaria.

The bottom three teams of each group find themselves relegated to one of the six Kreisligas. At the same time the six Kreisliga winners are promoted to the Bezirksliga. The runners-up of those face a play-off with each other and the 13th placed teams in the Bezirksliga.

The area covered by the Swabian FA is not identical with the Bezirk Schwaben, there is a large number of clubs from Upper Bavaria playing in Swabia, especially in the north.

The Bezirksliga Schwaben-Nord is fed by the following Kreisligas.

- Kreisliga Schwaben-Nord
- Kreisliga Schwaben-West
- Kreisliga Schwaben-Ost

Without doubt the greatest player ever to play in the Bezirksliga Schwaben-Nord was the legendary Gerd Müller. In his last season before signing with FC Bayern Munich in 1963–64 he scored 51 goals in 31 matches for his hometown club TSV 1861 Nördlingen and helped them win promotion!

In 2008–09, the FC Schrobenhausen, league champion in 2006–07 and Schwaben Cup finalist in 2008, failed to win or draw any of their league games and scored only five goals in 30 games, while conceding 223.

With the league reform at the end of the 2011–12 season, which included an expansion of the number of Landesligas from three to five, the Bezirksoberligas were disbanded. Instead, the Bezirksligas took the place of the Bezirksoberligas once more below the Landesligas.

The following qualifying modus applied at the end of the 2011–12 season:

- Champions: Promotion round to the Landesliga, winners to the Landesliga, losers to the Bezirksliga.
- Teams placed 2nd to 7th: Remain in the Bezirksliga.
- Teams placed 8th to 13th: Three additional Bezirksliga places to be determined in a play-off round, winners to the Bezirksliga, losers to the Kreisliga.
- Teams placed 14th to 16th: Directly relegated to Kreisliga.

=== League timeline ===
The league went through the following timeline of name changes, format and position in the league system:

Years	Name	Tier	Promotion to
1963–68	Bezirksliga Schwaben	V	Landesliga Bayern-Süd
1968–88	Bezirksliga Schwaben-Nord	V	Landesliga Bayern-Süd
1988–94	Bezirksliga Schwaben-Nord	VI	Bezirksoberliga Schwaben
1994–2008	Bezirksliga Schwaben-Nord	VII	Bezirksoberliga Schwaben
2008–12	Bezirksliga Schwaben-Nord	VIII	Bezirksoberliga Schwaben
2012–	Bezirksliga Schwaben-Nord	VII	Landesliga Bayern-Südwest

== League champions ==
The following teams have won the league:

Season	Club
1963–64	TSV 1861 Nördlingen
1964–65	BSK Neugablonz
1965–66	Schwaben Augsburg II
1966–67	BC Aichach
1967–68	TSV Schwabmünchen
1968–69	FC Lauingen
1969–70	VfR Jettingen
1970–71	FC Gundelfingen
1971–72	TSV Pfersee Augsburg
1972–73	SV Klingsmoos
1973–74	TSV 1861 Nördlingen
1974–75	TSV Rain am Lech
1975–76	FC Augsburg II
1976–77	BC Aichach
1977–78	TSG Stadtbergen
1978–79	SSV Dillingen
1979–80	SSV Glött
1980–81	TSV Rain am Lech
1981–82	TSV Aindling

Season	Club
1982–83	TSG Augsburg
1983–84	TSV Göggingen
1984–85	BC Aichach
1985–86	FC Lauingen
1986–87	TSV Dasing
1987–88	VfL Günzburg
1988–89	TSG Thannhausen
1989–90	SC Altenmünster
1990–91	SV Klingsmoos
1991–92	SC Altenmünster
1992–93	SpVgg Wiesenbach
1993–94	SC Bubesheim
1994–95	TSV Rain am Lech
1995–96	SSV Dillingen
1996–97	TSV Ziemetzhausen
1997–98	TSG Thannhausen
1998–99	SpVgg Wiesenbach
1999–2000	TSV Wemding
2000–01	TSV Gersthofen

Season	Club
2001–02	BC Rinnenthal
2002–03	FC Affing
2003–04	TSV Gersthofen
2004–05	BC Aichach
2005–06	SSV Höchstädt
2006–07	FC Schrobenhausen
2007–08	BC Aichach
2008–09	TSV Wertingen
2009–10	DJK Langenmosen
2010–11	TSV Dinkelscherben
2011–12	TSV Neusäß
2012–13	SC Bubesheim
2013–14	SC Ichenhausen
2014–15	TSV Meitingen
2015–16	FC Ehekirchen
2016–17	SV Cosmos Aystetten
2017–18	VfR Neuburg
2018–19	FC Ehekirchen
2019–21	TSV Gersthofen

- League title from 1963 to 1968 are for the single-division Bezirkliga Schwaben.
- With the SV Klingsmoos in 1973 and 1991, the FC Schrobenhausen in 2007 and the DJK Langenmosen in 2010, the title went four times to a club from Oberbayern.
- In 1982, the DJK Langenmoosen was promoted to the Landesliga as runners-up, the only club to do so from 1968 to 1988.
- In 2020, the season was suspended and then extended to 2021, when it was curtailed. TSV Gersthofen was ranked on a points per game basis.

=== Multiple winners ===
The following clubs have won the league more than once:

Club	Wins	Years
BC Aichach	5	1967, 1977, 1985, 2005, 2008
TSV Rain am Lech	3	1975, 1981, 1995
TSV Göggingen ^{1}	3	1976, 1984, 1995
TSV Gersthofen	3	2001, 2004, 2021
FC Ehekirchen	2	2016, 2019
SC Bubesheim	2	1994, 2013
TSV Neusäß ^{1}	2	1999, 2012
FC Augsburg II ^{1}	2	1976, 2003
SpVgg Wiesenbach	2	1993, 1999
TSG Thannhausen	2	1989, 1998
SSV Dillingen	2	1979, 1996
SC Altenmünster	2	1990, 1992
SV Klingsmoos	2	1973, 1991
FC Lauingen	2	1969, 1986
TSV 1861 Nördlingen	2	1964, 1974

- Southern division titles in italics.
- ^{1} FC Augsburg II, TSV Neusäß and the TSV Göggingen are the only three teams to have won both Bezirksligas, Nord and Süd.

== Current clubs ==
The clubs in the league in the 2021–22 season and their 2019–21 final position:

Club	Position
TSV Meitingen	9th
SC Bubesheim	15th
FC Stätzling	5th
VfL Ecknach	3rd
TSV Hollenbach	1st
TSV Aindling	2nd
TSV Wertingen	11th
TSV Nördlingen II	10th
FC Mertingen	14th
SC Altenmünster	16th
FC Affing	8th
FC Günzburg	7th
FC Horgau	Promoted from the Kreisliga
TSV Pöttmes	Promoted from the Kreisliga
SV Wörnitzstein-Berg	Promoted from the Kreisliga
TSV Ziemetshausen	Promoted from the Kreisliga
