= FC Gundelfingen =

German football club

FC 1920 Gundelfingen
- Full name: Fußball-Club 1920 Gundelfingen Verein für Leibesübungen e. V.
- Founded: 27 February 1920; 106 years ago
- Ground: Schwaben Stadion
- Capacity: 8,000
- Chairman: Viktor Merenda
- Manager: Francisco Copado
- League: Bayernliga Süd (VI)
- 2025–26: Bayernliga Süd, 4th
Home colours	Away colours

The FC Gundelfingen is a German association football club from Gundelfingen an der Donau, Bavaria. A longtime fourth and fifth division side, the club is one of the top sides from Schwaben and has six Schwäbischer-Pokal (Schwaben Cup) wins to its credit.

== History ==
=== Early years (1920–45) ===
The history of the club began in 1920, when a handful of young men from Gundelfingen bought a football and formed the "Wald- und Wiesenclub". Later, on 27 February 1920, 20 football-enthusiasts formed FC 1920 Gundelfingen at the "Gasthaus zum Kreuz". Shortly afterward, in December 1921, the footballers became part of the gymnastics club Turnverein 1863 Gundelfingen.

The club survived the turbulent days of 1923 with its hyperinflation, travelling to away matches on horse-drawn carts, and went on to win its first title in 1924 when they won the C-Klasse and gained promotion to the B-Klasse. Despite struggling financially, the club became independent again 1 March 1924 and adopted green and white as the new team colours. They went on to capture the B-Klasse title but refused promotion due to their poor financial state. In 1926, FCG met local rival FC Lauingen for the first time with the clubs playing to a 2–2 draw. 1928 brought another B-Klasse championship and this time the club accepted promotion to A-Klasse. On the club's tenth anniversary in 1930, it had 150 members.

FCG continued to suffer financial problems through the early 1930s and the formation of two new clubs, Catholic-sponsored DJK Gundelfingen and the worker's club ASV Gundelfingen, drew members away. The rise to power of the Nazis led to a ban on faith-based and worker's clubs in 1933, while other clubs like FCG were forced to accept club chairmen selected by the local NSDAP leader. The club did not distinguish itself in competition in those years and suffered a 0–9 defeat against BC Augsburg in 1937 regional cup match. Success returned in 1939 with the capture of the Kreisklasse Nord title, followed by an unbeaten run through the promotion round into the Bezirksklasse Schwaben.

With the start of World War II, FCG fielded only a first team as, throughout the country, young footballers were drafted to the army. Playing a reduced league program, the club still performed rather well, defeating FC Lauingen 9–2 in the 35th edition of the local derby. Despite the difficulties imposed by the war, the club remained one of the few in Schwaben to carry out football games almost to the end of the conflict, although these were mostly friendlies as other clubs had few players available.

=== Post war years (1946–63) ===
FC Gundelfingen applied and received a permission to play football matches from the allied occupation authorities shortly after the war and on 26 August 1946 played its first post-war match, a friendly against the FC Lauingen, a 6–2 win for the FCG. Of the 119 members on the roll in 1945, 42 were still away as prisoners of war, 28 had lost their lives and five were missing in action, leaving the club heavily depleted. With the return of league football in 1946, FCG found itself grouped in the 2. Schwäbische Liga.

They won the first ever Schwaben Cup in 1947, and on 13 June 1948 played their final game at their longtime home ground Am Pflanzengarten before moving to a new facility. FCG won its second cup in 1949 before 20,000 spectators in Augsburg in a curtain raiser match played before the BC Augsburg versus VfB Stuttgart Oberliga Süd contest.

Now part of the 2. Amateurliga Schwaben, they won a third Schwaben Cup title in 1955, and in 1963, opened the Schwaben Stadion.

=== Post Bundesliga years (1963–93) ===
German football was reorganized in 1963 with the establishment of the national first division Bundesliga and restructuring of all other lower-tier leagues. The 2. Amateurliga Schwaben became the Bezirksliga Schwaben (V) and from 1968 onwards was played in northern and southern groups. FCG belonged first to the Bezirksliga, and later, the Bezirksliga Schwaben-Nord (V), where they won the title in 1971. The club gained promotion to the Landesliga Bayern-Süd (IV) and firmly established themselves there. They finished fifth in 1974 and had three 6th-place results in the following years. At this time, the club also started fielding a women's team. In 1973, the club beat Luton Town 2–1 in a friendly in Gundelfingen. The Under-19 side won promotion to the A-Jugend Bayernliga Süd for the first time in 1976, the highest league for this age group in southern Bavaria and faced FC Bayern Munich and TSV 1860 Munich there.

Despite struggling, they survived relegation troubles through the 1980s, before an upturn in the 1990s. Ultimately they remained part of Landesliga play for 22 years, setting a league record. FCG also set an all-time record in the Landesliga Süd in 1991–92 when it conceded only 18 goals all season. In 1990, 1991 and 1992, FCG earned consecutive second-place finishes and captured their fourth and fifth Schwaben Cups in 1991 and 1992, making them the number three club in Schwaben behind FC Augsburg and FC Memmingen. Qualifying for the DFB-Pokal (German Cup), FC Gundelfingen narrowly lost to Bayer Uerdingen 1–0 at home, in front of 4,500. Playoff losses in 1990 to SpVgg Bayreuth (0–3) and in 1991 to SpVgg Landshut (1–2) kept the club from advancing to the Bayernliga, but in 1993, they finally won their way through with a 2–1 victory over BSC Erlangen and a 3–2 win after penalties over TSV Eching. The second team also won promotion, from the A-Klasse Nord (VI) to the Bezirksliga Schwaben-Nord.

=== The Bayernliga years (1994–present) ===
The club survived its first ever Bayernliga season with a 15th-place finish and improved their standing in the following two years seasons by finishing 11th and 8th. However, the club narrowly avoided relegation in 1994 when the introduction of the Regionalliga Süd led to restructuring of the lower divisions, which meant six clubs from Bavaria were promoted while only one was relegated. They recovered themselves over the following two campaigns and in 1995–96 FC Gundelfingen was the best-placed team from Schwaben in the Bayernliga, ahead of the FC Memmingen. In 1997, the club was unable to avoid being sent down for the first time since the end of the war when they finished ten points out of 14th place. They were sent down again at the end of the following season after a 17th place Landesliga result. FCG then quickly rebounded and made their way back to Landesliga play. They enjoyed three good seasons there, including a third-place finish just two points behind TSV Schwaben Augsburg in 2002. They also captured their sixth Schwaben Cup in 2001, but slipped again in 2003 and returned to Bezirksoberliga.

They earned generally good results there, except for a scare in 2006–07 that saw the team struggle through the first half of the season before recovering and ultimately finishing 10th. The next season, FCG won the Bezirksliga title and returned to the Landesliga. At the end of the 2011–12 season the club qualified for the promotion round to the newly expanded Bayernliga. After a first-round victory over FC Pipinsried the club was knocked out in the second round by FC Affing and failed to qualify for the Bayernliga, remaining in the Landesliga instead. A Landesliga championship in 2015–16 took the club back to the Bayernliga for the first time in almost 20 years.

== Honours ==
The club's honours:

=== League ===
- Landesliga Bayern-Süd (IV)
  - Runners-up: (3) 1991, 1992, 1993
- Landesliga Bayern-Südwest
  - Champions: 2016
- Bezirksoberliga Schwaben (VI)
  - Champions: 2009
  - Runners-up: 1999
- Bezirksliga Schwaben-Nord (V)
  - Champions: 1971

=== Cup ===
- Schwaben Cup
  - Winners: (6) 1947, 1949, 1955, 1991, 1992, 2001
  - Runners-up: (2) 1966, 1967

== Recent managers ==
The recent managers of the club:

Manager	Start	Finish
Peter Schmid		April 2004
Michael Unger / Thomas Jahn	April 2004	June 2004
Werner Schoupa		
Michael Unger		November 2005
Stefan Anderl	November 2005	2010
Armin Resselberger	2010	5 May 2012
Wilfried Mayer	5 May 2012	30 June 2012
Stefan Anderl	1 July 2012	30 June 2016
Francisco Copado	1 July 2016	Present

== Recent seasons ==
The recent season-by-season performance of the club:

Season	Division	Tier	Position
1967–68	Bezirksliga Schwaben	V	10th
1968–69	Bezirksliga Schwaben-Nord	V	2nd
1969–70	Bezirksliga Schwaben-Nord	V	6th
1970–71	Bezirksliga Schwaben-Nord	V	1st ↑
1971–72	Landesliga Bayern-Süd	IV	10th
1972–73	Landesliga Bayern-Süd	IV	11th
1973–74	Landesliga Bayern-Süd	IV	5th
1974–75	Landesliga Bayern-Süd	IV	11th
1975–76	Landesliga Bayern-Süd	IV	6th
1976–77	Landesliga Bayern-Süd	IV	6th
1977–78	Landesliga Bayern-Süd	IV	6th
1978–79	Landesliga Bayern-Süd	IV	9th
1979–80	Landesliga Bayern-Süd	IV	8th
1980–81	Landesliga Bayern-Süd	IV	10th
1981–82	Landesliga Bayern-Süd	IV	8th
1982–83	Landesliga Bayern-Süd	IV	14th
1983–84	Landesliga Bayern-Süd	IV	14th
1984–85	Landesliga Bayern-Süd	IV	7th
1985–86	Landesliga Bayern-Süd	IV	10th
1986–87	Landesliga Bayern-Süd	IV	12th
1987–88	Landesliga Bayern-Süd	IV	13th
1988–89	Landesliga Bayern-Süd	IV	13th
1989–90	Landesliga Bayern-Süd	IV	11th
1990–91	Landesliga Bayern-Süd	IV	2nd
1991–92	Landesliga Bayern-Süd	IV	2nd

Season	Division	Tier	Position
1992–93	Landesliga Bayern-Süd	IV	2nd ↑
1993–94	Bayernliga	III	15th
1994–95	Bayernliga	IV	11th
1995–96	Bayernliga	IV	8th
1996–97	Bayernliga	IV	16th ↓
1997–98	Landesliga Bayern-Süd	V	17th ↓
1998–99	Bezirksoberliga Schwaben	VI	2nd ↑
1999–2000	Landesliga Bayern-Süd	V	7th
2000–01	Landesliga Bayern-Süd	V	6th
2001–02	Landesliga Bayern-Süd	V	3rd
2002–03	Landesliga Bayern-Süd	V	17th ↓
2003–04	Bezirksoberliga Schwaben	VI	6th
2004–05	Bezirksoberliga Schwaben	VI	3rd
2005–06	Bezirksoberliga Schwaben	VI	10th
2006–07	Bezirksoberliga Schwaben	VI	4th
2007–08	Bezirksoberliga Schwaben	VI	10th
2008–09	Bezirksoberliga Schwaben	VII	1st ↑
2009–10	Landesliga Bayern-Süd	VI	14th
2010–11	Landesliga Bayern-Süd	VI	9th
2011–12	Landesliga Bayern-Süd	VI	13th
2012–13	Landesliga Bayern-Südwest	VI	4th
2013–14	Landesliga Bayern-Südwest	VI	8th
2014–15	Landesliga Bayern-Südwest	VI	4th
2015–16	Landesliga Bayern-Südwest	VI	1st ↑
2015–16	Bayernliga Süd	V	

- With the introduction of the Bezirksoberligas in 1988 as the new fifth tier, below the Landesligas, all leagues below dropped one tier. With the introduction of the Regionalligas in 1994 and the 3. Liga in 2008 as the new third tier, below the 2. Bundesliga, all leagues below dropped one tier. With the establishment of the Regionalliga Bayern as the new fourth tier in Bavaria in 2012 the Bayernliga was split into a northern and a southern division, the number of Landesligas expanded from three to five and the Bezirksoberligas abolished. All leagues from the Bezirksligas onwards were elevated one tier.

↑ Promoted	↓ Relegated

== DFB-Pokal appearances ==
The club has qualified for the first round of the German Cup only once:

Season	Round	Date	Home	Away	Result	Attendance
1992–93 DFB-Pokal	First round	18 August 1992	FC Gundelfingen	KFC Uerdingen 05	0–1	

== Local rivals ==
The FC Lauingen is the number one rival for the club, being only a few kilometres away. The two teams have however not played in the same league now since 1987. Their last competitive meeting was in the Schwaben Cup in 2005–06 when the FCG won 2–0.
