= FC Pipinsried =

German association football club

Pipinsried
- Full name: Fußballclub Pipinsried e. V.
- Founded: 1967
- Ground: Stadion an der Reichertshausener Straße
- Capacity: 2,500
- Chairman: Benny Rauch
- Manager: Josef Steinberger
- League: Bayernliga Süd (V)
- 2025–26: Bayernliga Süd, 6th of 17
Home colours	Away colours

Football Club Pipinsried is a German association football club from the town of Pipinsried, Bavaria.

== History ==
FC Pipinsried was formed in 1967 and, for most of its early history, the club was an amateur side in local Bavarian football. While based in Upper Bavaria the club opted to enter the leagues of neighboring Bavarian Swabia and started competitive football in the C-Klasse, the lowest tier of Bavarian football at the time, earning promotion to the B-Klasse in 1975. In 1978 it climbed another level, now to the A-Klasse, where it immediately won another championship and earned another promotion, now to the Bezirksliga in 1979. It first rose above the leagues of Swabia in 1989 when it finished runners-up of the Bezirksoberliga Schwaben in the league's inaugural season. Pipinsried entered the Landesliga Bayern-Süd for four seasons from 1989 to 1993 but never finished higher than eleventh in that time and, at the end of it, was relegated back to the Bezirksoberliga.

The club spent the next six seasons back in the Bezirksoberliga Schwaben, coming close to promotion again in 1996 and 1998, when the side came third. It won the league championship the following season, 1998–99, and moved up to the Landesliga once more. The next thirteen seasons were spent in Landesliga Süd with Pipinsried, for the most part, struggling against relegation. From 2000 to 2003 the club had a reasonable run in the league, finishing as high as fifth in 2002, but declining once more after this. Nevertheless, FC Pipinsried survived in the Landesliga Süd until 2012 when the league was disbanded.

With the number of Landesligas expanded from three to five and the Bayernliga doubled in size, the club qualified for the promotion round to the new southern division of the Bayernliga but was knocked out by FC Gundelfingen in the first round. Instead, Pipinsried was grouped in the new Landesliga Bayern-Südwest. In this league, with a large number of former Landesliga Süd top-teams now promoted to the Bayernliga, Pipinsried won the inaugural league title in 2012–13 to earn promotion to the southern division of the Bayernliga. Another strong performance the following season saw the club finish third in the Bayernliga and qualify for the Regionalliga promotion round, where it was knocked out in the first round by TSV 1860 Rosenheim.

The club came third in the league again in 2014–15 and once more benefitted by a club above it deciding not to apply for a Regionalliga licence, thereby qualifying for the promotion round again. Pipinsried was defeated on aggregate by VfR Garching in the first round.

During the 2016–17 season, Pipinsried achieved its first-ever promotion to the Regionalliga, the fourth tier of German football. The club secured its place in the league by defeating the SpVgg Greuther Fürth II in the promotion play-offs, winning 3–2 in extra time after a 1–1 draw in the first leg.

However, after two seasons in the fourth tier, Pipinsried were relegated back to the fifth-tier Bayernliga. The club returned to the Regionalliga Bayern in 2021 but were relegated again after two seasons.

== Current squad ==
As of 8 September 2026

Note: Flags indicate national team as defined under FIFA eligibility rules; some limited exceptions apply. Players may hold more than one non-FIFA nationality.

No.	Pos.	Nation	Player
2	DF	ISR	Petter Elwahab
3	DF	GER	Sebastian Keßler
4	DF	GER	Tobias Reithmeir
5	MF	GER	Maximilian Haas
6	MF	GER	Mario Götzendörfer
7	MF	GER	Patrick Weihrauch
8	DF	GER	Max Dombrowka
9	FW	KOS	Valdrin Konjuhi
10	FW	GER	Nenad Petkovic
11	FW	GER	Alexander Seifert
12	GK	GER	Maximilian Schmauß
14	DF	GER	Benjamin Kvist
15	FW	GER	Lysander Weiß

No.	Pos.	Nation	Player
17	FW	GER	Florian Gebert
18	FW	GER	David Anyaonu
19	MF	GER	Matthias Roithmayr
20	DF	GER	Mohammed Sanawar
21	MF	GER	Tobias Ullmann
22	GK	GER	Quentin Jakob
25	DF	GER	Benedikt Lobenhofer
27	MF	GER	Jusuf Amdouni
34	MF	GER	Jonas Lindner
44	DF	GER	Tobias Reichl
47	MF	GER	Jaroud Kanze (on loan from Wacker Burghausen)
68	GK	DOM	Enrique Bösl

== Honours ==
The club's honours:

=== League ===
- Bayernliga Süd (V)
  - Champions: 2021
- Landesliga Bayern-Südwest (VI)
  - Champions: 2013
- Bezirksoberliga Schwaben (V)
  - Champions: 1999
  - Runners-up: 1989

== Recent managers ==
Recent managers of the club:

Manager	Start	Finish
Tobias Strobl	1 July 2012	30 June 2015
Ömer Kanca	1 July 2015	26 August 2015
Bernd Weiß	26 August 2015	30 June 2016
Fabian Hürzeler (player-coach)	1 July 2016	30 June 2020
Andreas Thomas	1 July 2020	7 November 2021
Andreas Pummer	7 November 2021	30 June 2022
Miljan Prijovic	1 July 2022	10 October 2022
Nikola Jelišić	11 October 2022	31 October 2022
Frank Peuker	1 November 2022	6 November 2022
Atdhedon Lushi (caretaker)	7 November 2022	21 December 2022
Herbert Paul (player-coach)	22 December 2022	30 June 2023
Martin Weng	1 July 2023	14 April 2024
Josef Steinberger	15 April 2024	Present

== Recent seasons ==
The recent season-by-season performance of the club:

Season	Division	Tier	Position
1999–2000	Landesliga Bayern-Süd	V	15th
2000–01	Landesliga Bayern-Süd	V	9th
2001–02	Landesliga Bayern-Süd	V	5th
2002–03	Landesliga Bayern-Süd	V	9th
2003–04	Landesliga Bayern-Süd	V	16th
2004–05	Landesliga Bayern-Süd	V	11th
2005–06	Landesliga Bayern-Süd	V	8th
2006–07	Landesliga Bayern-Süd	V	12th
2007–08	Landesliga Bayern-Süd	V	12th
2008–09	Landesliga Bayern-Süd	VI	14th
2009–10	Landesliga Bayern-Süd	VI	15th
2010–11	Landesliga Bayern-Süd	VI	11th
2011–12	Landesliga Bayern-Süd	VI	11th
2012–13	Landesliga Bayern-Südwest	VI	1st ↑
2013–14	Bayernliga Süd	V	3rd
2014–15	Bayernliga Süd	V	3rd
2015–16	Bayernliga Süd	V	10th
2016–17	Bayernliga Süd	V	3rd ↑
2017–18	Regionalliga Bayern	IV	14th
2018–19	Regionalliga Bayern	IV	17th ↓
2019–21	Bayernliga Süd	V	1st ↑
2021–22	Regionalliga Bayern	IV	13th
2022–23	Regionalliga Bayern	IV	20th ↓
2023–24	Bayernliga Süd	V	8th

- With the introduction of the Bezirksoberligas in 1988 as the new fifth tier, below the Landesligas, all leagues below dropped one tier. With the introduction of the Regionalligas in 1994 and the 3. Liga in 2008 as the new third tier, below the 2. Bundesliga, all leagues below dropped one tier. With the establishment of the Regionalliga Bayern as the new fourth tier in Bavaria in 2012 the Bayernliga was split into a northern and a southern division, the number of Landesligas expanded from three to five and the Bezirksoberligas abolished. All leagues from the Bezirksligas onwards were elevated one tier.

↑ Promoted	↓ Relegated
