= Bezirksoberliga Schwaben =

- Founded: 1988
- Folded: 2012
- Country: Germany
- State: Bavaria
- Level on pyramid: Level 7
- Promotion to: Landesliga Süd
- Relegation to: Bezirksliga Nord; Bezirksliga Süd
- Last champions: FC Affing (2011–12)

The Bezirksoberliga Schwaben was the seventh tier of the German football league system in the Bavarian Regierungsbezirk of Swabia (German: Schwaben). Until the introduction of the 3. Liga in 2008 it was the sixth tier of the league system, until the introduction of the Regionalligas in 1994 the fifth tier.

The league was disbanded at the end of the 2011–12 season, when major changes to the Bavarian football league system were carried out. Above the Bezirksoberligas, the Landesligas were expanded in number from three to five divisions and the Bezirke have two to three regional leagues, the Bezirksligas, as its highest level again, similar to the system in place until 1988.

== Overview ==
The Bezirksoberligas in Bavaria were introduced in 1988 upon the suggestion of the 1. FC Sonthofen in 1986, to create a highest single-division playing level for each of the seven Regierungsbezirke. The term Bezirksoberliga translates roughly into County Premier League, a Regierungsbezirk being a similar administrative entity to a County.

Before the introduction of the Bezirksoberligas, the Bezirksliga was the level of play below the Landesliga. The Bezirksliga Schwaben-Nord and Schwaben-Süd fed the Landesliga Bayern-Süd as they afterwards feed the Bezirksoberliga Schwaben. From 1963 to 1968 there was only one common Bezirksliga in Schwaben, similar to what the Bezirksoberliga does now. From 1968 onwards the Bezirksligas were always split.

The winner of the Bezirksoberliga Schwaben, like the winner of the Bezirksoberliga Oberbayern, was directly promoted to the Landesliga Bayern-Süd. The two second placed teams out of those league's played-off for another promotion spot. The winner went to Landesliga, the loser faced the 15th placed team out of the Landesliga for the last spot there. However, in some years additional promotion places were available in the Landesliga. In 1994, 2000 and 2004, three teams from Schwaben gained promotion to the Landesliga.

The three bottom teams of the Bezirksoberliga were relegated to the Bezirksliga, the team just above those faced a play-off against the second placed Bezirksliga teams.

The area covered by the Schwaben FA is not identical to the Bezirk Schwaben, mainly because that the Bezirks borders, like everywhere in Bavaria, were altered in the 1970s in a border reform. Therefore, there are quite a few clubs playing in Schwaben that are actually at home in Oberbayern. The TSV Landsberg and the FC Pipinsried are the most successful of those but others have made it into the Bezirksoberliga too. Also, some clubs from western Schwaben are playing in the Baden-Württemberg football league system. These are called the Iller Vereine after the river Iller that forms the border in this area. These mostly left the Schwaben FA in 1946, but some, like the SpVgg Lindau, have always played in Württemberg.

Another oddity is the club SV Casino Kleinwalsertal, playing in the Schwaben but being at home in Austria. The Kleinwalsertal can only be accessed by land via Germany.

The Schwaben Cup, one of the seven now defunct Bezirkspokale (Cups), featured another oddity. It heavily favours low-level clubs. A lower-level club always had home advantage to the higher one and also only need a draw to advance. In 1994 the SC Altenmünster and in 1998 the BC Aichach both won the cup against higher classed Bayernliga club FC Memmingen by drawing after extra time. The rule was changed for the cup-final game after 1998.

The region of Schwaben is actually much larger than the Bavarian region of Schwaben, it compromises all of the state of Baden-Württemberg and event relates linguistically into Austria and Switzerland. In football however, the only region that carries the name is the Bavarian region of Schwaben.

With the league reform at the end of the 2011–12 season, which includes an expansion of the number of Landesligas from three to five, the Bezirksoberligas were disbanded. Instead, the Bezirksligas took the place of the Bezirksoberligas below the Landesligas once more.

The clubs from the Bezirksoberliga joined the following leagues:

- Champions: Promotion round to the Bayernliga, winners to the Bayernliga, losers to the Landesliga.
- Teams placed 2nd to 6th: Directly qualified to the Landesliga.
- Teams placed 7th to 10th: Three additional Landesliga places to be determined in a play-off round with the Bezirksliga champions, losers enter Bezirksliga.
- Teams placed 11th to 16th: Directly relegated to Bezirksligas

== Top-three of the Bezirksoberliga ==
The top-three finishers in the league since its interception:

**Season**	**Champions**	**Runners-up**	**Third**
1988–89	**TSV Dasing**	**FC Pipinsried**	TSV 1861 Nördlingen
1989–90	**TSG Thannhausen** ^{+}	SVO Germaringen ^{+}	TSV 1861 Nördlingen
1990–91	**TSV Mindelheim**	TSV Landsberg	FC Kempten
1991–92	**TSV 1861 Nördlingen**	**TSV Aindling**	TSV Landsberg
1992–93	**TSV Kottern**	**FC Enikon Augsburg** ^{+}	TSV Landsberg ^{+}
1993–94	**SpVgg Kaufbeuren**	**FC Kempten**	**TSV Landsberg**
1994–95	**TSV Bobingen**	**DJK Lechhausen** ^{+}	TSV Friedberg ^{+}
1995–96	**BC Aichach** ^{+}	**TSV Mindelheim** ^{+}	FC Pipinsried
1996–97	**TSV Rain am Lech**	**FC Kempten**	TSV Kottern
1997–98	**SpVgg Kaufbeuren**	TSV Friedberg	FC Pipinsried
1998–99	**FC Pipinsried**	**FC Gundelfingen**	SC Bubesheim
1999–2000	**SC Bubesheim** ^{+}	**FC Königsbrunn** ^{+}	**TSV Schwabmünchen**
2000–01	**TSV 1861 Nördlingen**	**TSG Thannhausen** ^{+}	SpVgg Kaufbeuren ^{+}
2001–02	**TSV Kottern**	**TSV Neusäss**	TSV Schwabmünchen
2002–03	**DJK Lechhausen**	**TSV Schwabmünchen**	TSV Bobingen
2003–04	**FC Augsburg II**	**TSG Thannhausen**	**TSV 1861 Nördlingen**
2004–05	**TSV Kottern**	**FC Affing** ^{+}	FC Gundelfingen ^{+}
2005–06	**FC Königsbrunn** ^{+}	TSV Gersthofen ^{+}	1. FC Sonthofen
2006–07	**1. FC Sonthofen**	**TSV Gersthofen**	FC Memmingen II
2007–08	**TSV Schwabmünchen**	**FC Memmingen II**	DJK Lechhausen
2008–09	**FC Gundelfingen**	**TSV Landsberg**	TSV Marktoberdorf
2009–10	**TSV Kottern**	SC Bubesheim	TSV Schwaben Augsburg
2010–11	**BC Aichach**	**VfB Durach**	**1. FC Sonthofen**
2011–12	**FC Affing**	**SV Mering**	**TSV 1861 Nördlingen**

- Promoted teams in **bold**.
- ^{+} Teams finished on equal points, decider needed to determine final position.

=== Multiple winners ===
The following clubs have won the league more than once:

**Club**	**Wins**	**Years**
TSV Kottern	4	1993, 2002, 2005, 2010
BC Aichach	2	1996, 2011
TSV 1861 Nördlingen	2	1992, 2001
SpVgg Kaufbeuren	2	1994, 1998

== League placings ==
The final placings in the league since its interception:

Club	S	89	90	91	92	93	94	95	96	97	98	99	00	01	02	03	04	05	06	07	08	09	10	11	12
TSV Aindling	3	L	4	5	2	L	L	L	L	B	B	B	B	B	B	B	B	B	B	B	B	B	B	B	B
TSV Rain am Lech	2								5	1	L	L	L	L	L	L	L	L	L	L	L	B	B	B	B
TSV Gersthofen	4														14			4	2	2	L	L	L	L	B
FC Pipinsried	7	2	L	L	L	L	8	5	3	6	3	1	L	L	L	L	L	L	L	L	L	L	L	L	L
FC Augsburg II ^{1}	2	12															1	L	L	L	L	L	L	L	L
TSG Thannhausen	8		1	L	6	14		13				12	8	2	L	L	2	L	L	L	B	B	B	L	L
TSV Schwabmünchen	7											9	3	L	3	2	L	16		9	1	L	L	L	L
FC Gundelfingen	7	L	L	L	L	L	B	B	B	B	L	2	L	L	L	L	6	3	10	4	10	1	L	L	L
TSV Landsberg	13	L	L	2	3	3	3	L	L	L	B	L	13	4	5	4	8	12	15		8	2	L	L	L
TSV Kottern	15	13	16		5	1	L	L	L	3	9	11	10	13	1	L	12	1	L	L	9	6	1	L	L
BC Aichach	7	L	L	L	L	L	L	L	1	L	L	L	L	14					13	14		10	5	1	L
VfB Durach	5																			10	4	5	10	2	L
1. FC Sonthofen	10											10	7	6	8	6	5	8	3	1	L	L	L	3	L
FC Affing	3																4	2	L	L	L	L	L	L	1
SV Mering	1																								2
TSV 1861 Nördlingen	14	3	3	4	1	L	L	L	L	L	11	4	9	1	L	5	3	L	L	L	L	4	8	7	3
TSV Mindelheim	11	6	5	1	L	L	4	6	2	L	L	L	L	16								8	11	4	4
SpVgg Kaufbeuren	22	7	8	6	6	4	1	L	7	4	1	L	5	3	10	7	7	10	9	7	7	9	6	9	5
TSV Ottobeuren	2			16																					6
TSV Bobingen	16		6	7	11	11	11	1	L	L	L	L	L	L	L	3	9	7	6	13	11	12	7	13	7
FC Memmingen II	14						14	11	10	5	6	5	15					5	4	3	2	L	4	6	8
FC Königsbrunn	9	L	L	L	L	L	L	L	L	L	4	6	2	L	L	L	L	6	1	L	L	13	12	5	9
SV Egg an der Günz	1																								10
TSV Marktoberdorf	11							8	13								11	13	7	5	6	3	13	11	11
TSV Wertingen	5	9	9	14																			16		12
TSV Babenhausen	7										12	15		15		10	14							8	13
TSV Dinkelscherben	1																								14
Schwaben Augsburg	4	B	B	L	B	L	L	L	L	L	L	B	B	B	L	B	L	L	L	L	14		3	12	15
TSV Rain am Lech II	2																							10	16
SC Bubesheim	11							9	14		8	3	1	L	L	L	L	L	5	6	5	7	2	14	
DJK Langenmosen	1																							15	
BCA Oberhausen	2																						9	16	
FC Kempten	8	11	11	3	9	6	2	L	L	2	L	L	B	B	L	L	L	L	B	L	B	L	14		
Türkspor Augsburg	5																		11	11	12	11	15		
DJK Lechhausen	9						6	2	L	L	L	L	4	5	4	1	L	L	L	8	3	14			
FC Kempten II	1																					15			
TSG Thannhausen II	2																				13	16			
FC Schrobenhausen	1																				15				
SSV Höchstädt	2																			12	16				
TSV Neusäss	11					5	5	4	4	9	15		6	7	2	L	L	L	8	15					
TSV Haunstetten	3								17										12	16					
TSV Friedberg	8					15		3	6	7	2	13						9	14						
TSV Hilgertshausen	3																13	11	16						
FC Stätzling	4														9	6	10	14							
TSV Pöttmes	1																	15							
TSV Krumbach	2															11	15								
ASV Fellheim	5									13				9	9	8	16								
BC Rinnenthal	2															12	17								
FC Lauingen	4	15												12	12	13									
SVO Germaringen	11	5	2	8	7	7	9	14					12	10	13	14									
TSV Betzigau	2														11	15									
TSV Wemding	4									15				11	7	16									
TSV Leitershofen	5										7	8	11	8	15										
SpVgg Wiesenbach	7	14					7	7	8	11	14		14		16										
SSV Glött	1												16												
FC Heimertingen	4									10	5	7	17												
FC Zell-Bruck	8			10	13	13		10	9	8	10	14													
TSV Ziemtshausen	2										13	16													
SSV Dillingen	3				14					12	16														
TSV Göggingen	4	10	14						11	14															
SV Grasheim	4					9	15		12	16															
SC Altenmünster	5			13		10	10	12	15																
TSV Dasing	2	1	L	L	L	L	L	L	16																
FC Enikon Augsburg ^{2}	1					2	L	B																	
TSV Burgau	3		15				12	15																	
TSG Augsburg	7	8	7	9	8	12	13	16																	
BSC Memmingen	6	4	12	11	12	8	16																		
TSV Friesenried	2				10	16																			
Stadtwerke SV Augsburg	3		10	12	15																				
SV Klingsmoos	1				16																				
VfL Kaufering	1			15																					
VfL Günzburg	1	L	13																						
TG Viktoria Augsburg	1	16																							

=== Key ===
Color	Key
B	Bayernliga
L	Landesliga Süd
1, 2, 3, ...	Bezirksoberliga
1	League champions
	Played at a league level below this league

- S = No of seasons in league (as of 2011-12)

=== Notes ===
- ^{1} The FC Augsburg II withdrew from the league in 1989.
- ^{2} The FC Enikon Augsburg withdrew from the Oberliga in 1995.

== All-time table 1988–2012 ==
The SpVgg Kaufbeuren leads the all-time table of this league with 1,061 points, 326 points ahead of the TSV 1861 Nördlingen, third placed is the TSV Kottern. The SV Klingsmoos holds the 71st and last place with 16 points. The SpVgg Kaufbeuren has spent 22 out of a possible 24 seasons in the Bezirksoberliga, only interrupted by two one-year stints in the Landesliga. For the 2011–12 season, the last of the league, three clubs joined it that have never before played in it, the TSV Dinkelscherben, SV Mering and SV Egg an der Günz.
