= SpVgg Lindau =

German football club

- Full name: SpVgg Lindau 1919
- Founded: 1919
- Ground: Reutiner Straße
- Capacity: unknown
- Chairman: Michael Lehmann
- Manager: Helmut Stegmaier
- League: Kreisliga Bodensee A (IX)
- 2015–16: Kreisliga Bodensee B4 (X), 1st (promoted)
Home colours

The SpVgg Lindau is a German football club from Lindau, Bavaria.

== Overview ==
The club was formed on 1 August 1919 as the football department of the TSV 1850 Lindau under the leadership of Sosthenes Sailer and its first chairman Goldbrunner. The new club was put into the A-Klasse Gau Oberschwaben, where it remained in the coming years. Despite being a Bavarian club, the team always competed in neighbouring Württemberg, which it is geographically much closer to than to clubs in the Bavarian region of Schwaben where it politically belongs to.

In 1924, a new law in Germany stipulated that football clubs had to be clearly separated from other sports clubs and the team was renamed VfL Lindau, now under the leadership of Jakob Egg.

In 1928, the club achieved its first success with the championship in the A-Klasse and promotion to the Bezirksliga.

In 1934, a new football stadium was opened in town, the Städtische Stadion. To celebrate this occasion, a game between the FC Bayern Munich and SSV Ulm was organised which Bayern won 3–2.

During the years of World War II, football in Lindau actually received a boost with a large number of German soldiers stationed in town. By 1944 however, football came gradually to a halt as most of those were sent to the front line.

Football only resumed in Lindau in April 1946, with permission of the allied authorities, when the SG Lindau was formed.

Facing the rather unusual situation of having to many players, the club split in 1950 in two new ones: The ESV Lindau and SpVgg Lindau.

SpVgg Lindau was formed on 5 March 1950 in the "Gasthof Schweitzerhof", a restaurant and pub and the new club was integrated in the A-Klasse Bodensee that year. SpVgg finished on top of that league in its first year and gained promotion to the 2nd Amateurliga Oberschwaben where they played for two seasons before being relegated back down. Immediately winning promotion back to the 2nd Amateurliga, the club managed to stay there this time, achieving a championship in this league in 1961. SpVgg Lindau however failed to gain promotion to the Amateurliga Schwarzwald-Bodensee, losing its promotion matches.

The year after, the club achieved its goal, promotion to the third division Amateurliga Schwarzwald-Bodensee, on the strength of another 2nd Amateurliga championship. In 1966, the SpVgg managed to win the Württemberg Cup with a 5–3 victory over the TSG Backnang. This qualified them for the Southern German Cup where they lost 0–6 to SSV Reutlingen. In 1968, they won the cup again, this time with a 1–0 victory over Union Böckingen.

In league football, a second place in the Amateurliga (III) in 1967 and 1973 were the greatest success the club achieved so far in its history.

With the reorganisation of league football in Germany and Baden-Württemberg, mainly the interception of the Oberliga Baden-Württemberg and the Verbandsliga Württemberg, the SpVgg found itself relegated to fourth tier, missing the qualification to the new Oberliga by only finishing 11th in the Amateurliga. Sixteen years of being a third-division outfit came to an end.

Relegated to the Landesliga, things got worse for the SpVgg Lindau in 1979–80, when the club was relegated again, to the Bezirksliga. In 1982, the club managed to correct this by winning the Bezirksliga and gaining promotion back to the Landesliga. To this league, they only belonged for two seasons, being relegated again in 1984. In 1985, the drop got even worse when the SpVgg was relegated to the seventh-tier Kreisliga A, the clubs deepest fall ever.

In 1988, the club managed to rectify this disgrace, winning the league and promoting themselves back to the Bezirksliga, largely on the strength of its goalscorer Thommes who scored 37 goals in 26 games. Nine years in this league followed, with a fourth place in 1991–92 the highlight. In 1997, the club went down again, but only for one season, where the club only suffered one defeat and won promotion comfortably.

Under coach Andreas Wagenhaus, a former East German international, the club came close to promotion with a third-place finish in the Bezirksliga in 2000, but only two years later, relegation was unavoidable again. Until the 2013–14 season, the SpVgg Lindau played in the Kreisliga A Staffel II, when it was relegated to the Kreisliga B. A title in this league in 2015–16 moved the club back up to the Kreisliga A.

The SpVgg Lindau has a somewhat unusual geographical location in German football, based only a few kilometres from the Austrian border, within view of Switzerland and Liechtenstein. It is hardly surprising then, that for its under-16s girls tournament in 2008, of the eight invited clubs three are from Germany, two each from Switzerland and Austria and one from Liechtenstein.

== Honours ==
The club's honours:

=== League ===
- A-Klasse Oberschwaben
  - Champions: 1928
- A-Klasse Bodensee (V)
  - Champions: (2) 1951, 1954
- 2nd Amateurliga Oberschwaben (IV)
  - Champions: (2) 1961, 1962
- Amateurliga Schwarzwald-Bodensee (III)
  - Runners-up: (2) 1967, 1973
- Bezirksliga (VI)
  - Champions: 1982
- Kreisliga A Staffel II (VII)
  - Champions: (2) 1988, 1998
- Kreisliga Bodensee B4 (X)
  - Champions: 2016

=== Cup ===
- Württemberg Cup
  - Winners: (2) 1966, 1968

== Recent seasons ==
The recent season-by-season performance of the club:

Season	Division	Tier	Position
1999–2000	Bezirksliga Bodensee	VII	3rd
2000–01	Bezirksliga Bodensee	VII	
2001–02	Bezirksliga Bodensee	VII	↓
2002–03	Kreisliga Bodensee A2	VII	
2003–04	Kreisliga Bodensee A2	VII	8th
2004–05	Kreisliga Bodensee A2	VII	3rd
2005–06	Kreisliga Bodensee A2	VII	5th
2006–07	Kreisliga Bodensee A2	VII	5th
2007–08	Kreisliga Bodensee A2	VII	3rd
2008–09	Kreisliga Bodensee A2	IX	8th
2009–10	Kreisliga Bodensee A2	IX	8th
2010–11	Kreisliga Bodensee A2	IX	6th
2011–12	Kreisliga Bodensee A2	IX	11th
2012–13	Kreisliga Bodensee A2	IX	9th
2013–14	Kreisliga Bodensee A2	IX	13th ↓
2014–15	Kreisliga Bodensee B4	X	4th
2015–16	Kreisliga Bodensee B4	X	1st ↑
2016–17	Kreisliga Bodensee A	IX	

- With the introduction of the Regionalligas in 1994 and the 3. Liga in 2008 as the new third tier, below the 2. Bundesliga, all leagues below dropped one tier.

↑ Promoted	↓ Relegated

== DFB Cup appearances ==
The club has qualified for the first round of the German Cup only once:

Season	Round	Date	Home	Away	Result	Attendance
DFB Cup 1975–76	First round	1 August 1975	SpVgg Lindau	Itzehoer SV	3–0	
DFB Cup 1975–76	Second round	18 October 1975	SC Jülich 1910	SpVgg Lindau	5–1	

== Former players ==
- Karl-Heinz Mrosko, started his career with SpVgg Lindau, first and second Bundesliga player, also played for Oakland Stompers
