= Bavarian football league system =

- Country: Bavaria
- Sport: Association football
- Promotion and relegation: Yes

National system
- Federation: Bavarian Football Association
- Confederation: UEFA
- Top division: Regionalliga Bayern (men); Frauen-Regionalliga Bayern (women)
- Second division: Bayernliga (men); Frauen-Bayernliga (women)
- Cup competition: Bavarian Cup (men); Women's Bavarian Cup (women)

The Bavarian football league system of the Bavarian Football Association ranks within the German football league system. Its highest division, the Regionalliga Bayern, is currently the fourth tier of German football. The lowest league in Bavaria is currently the C-Klasse, which is the 12th tier of German football.

In 2012, the league system experienced a major overhaul when the Regionalliga Bayern was established, the Bayernliga split into two regional divisions and the Landesliga expanded from three to five divisions.

== The league system ==
=== Men ===
The top-tiers of the league system as operated from 2014–15 onwards:

Level	League(s)/Division(s)						
I	Bundesliga; 18 clubs						
II	2. Bundesliga; 18 clubs						
III	3. Liga; 20 clubs						
IV	Regionalliga Bayern; 18 clubs						
V	Bayernliga Nord; 18 clubs				Bayernliga Süd; 18 clubs		
VI	Landesliga Nordost; 18 clubs		Landesliga Nordwest; 17 clubs	Landesliga Mitte; 18 clubs		Landesliga Südost; 17 clubs	Landesliga Südwest; 17 clubs
VII	Bezirksligas Unterfranken	Bezirksligas Oberfranken	Bezirksligas Mittelfranken	Bezirksligas Oberpfalz	Bezirksligas Niederbayern	Bezirksligas Oberbayern	Bezirksligas Schwaben (see also: Swabian football league system)
VII	East West	East West	Mittelfranken 1 Mittelfranken 2	North South	East West	North South East	North South
VIII	Kreisligas Unterfranken	Kreisligas Oberfranken	Kreisligas Mittelfranken	Kreisligas Oberpfalz	Kreisligas Niederbayern	Kreisligas Oberbayern	Kreisligas Schwaben
VIII	Würzburg 1 Würzburg 2 Aschaffenburg Rhön Schweinfurt 1 Schweinfurt 2	Bamberg Bayreuth Coburg Kronach Hof Marktredwitz	Nuremberg Frankenhöhe Jura Neumarkt Erlangen/Pegnitz 1 Erlangen/Pegnitz 2	Regensburg 1 Regensburg 2 Amberg Weiden Cham Schwandorf	Passau Straubing Isar-Rott Donau-Laaber	Zugspitze 1 Zugspitze 2 Inn/Salzach 1 Inn/Salzach 2 Danube/Isar 1 Danube/Isar 2 Munich 1 Munich 2 Munich 3	North East West Augsburg Central South
IX	Kreisklasses Unterfranken	Kreisklasses Oberfranken	Kreisklasses Mittelfranken	Kreisklasses Oberpfalz	Kreisklasses Niederbayern	Kreisklasses Oberbayern	Kreisklasses Schwaben
IX	14 Kreisklasses	13 Kreisklasses	13 Kreisklasses	9 Kreisklasses	11 Kreisklasses	18 Kreisklasses	13 Kreisklasses
X	A-Klasses Unterfranken	A-Klasses Oberfranken	A-Klasses Mittelfranken	A-Klasses Oberpfalz	A-Klasses Niederbayern	A-Klasses Oberbayern	A-Klasses Schwaben
X	20 A-Klasses	20 A-Klasses	21 A-Klasse	11 A-Klasses	19 A-Klasses	28 A-Klasses	13 A-Klasses
XI	B-Klasses Unterfranken	B-Klasses Oberfranken	B-Klasses Mittelfranken	B-Klasses Oberpfalz		B-Klasses Oberbayern	B-Klasses Schwaben
XI	26 B-Klasses	19 B-Klasses	24 B-Klasses	16 B-Klasses		27 B-Klasses	23 B-Klasses
XII						C-Klasses Oberbayern	
XII						27 C-Klasses	

==== Notes ====
Denotes parts of league system above Bavarian level.

- All leagues on same level run parallel.
- League strengths are nominal and may vary from season to season.

== Recent changes ==
In 1988, upon the suggestion of the 1. FC Sonthofen in 1986, the Bezirksoberligas were introduced in Bavaria, set between the already existing Landesligas and Bezirksligas.

In 1998, the Bavarian FA renamed the three lowest football leagues:

- A-Klasse became Kreisliga
- B-Klasse became Kreisklasse
- C-Klasse became A-Klasse

On top of this, in some of the seven Bezirke, two new lowest levels were introduced and named B and C-Klasse. The reason for this was the integration of all reserve teams into the normal competition. In the Bezirke who did not follow suit, like Schwaben, the reserve teams of clubs in the Kreisliga and below still compete in separate, parallel leagues.

The Bavarian football federation carried out drastic changes to the league system at the end of the 2011–12 season. With the introduction of the Regionalliga Bayern from 2012–13, it placed two Bayernligas below the Regionalliga. Below those, five Landesligas instead of the existing three were set, which were geographically divided to limit travel and increase the number of local derbies.

=== Matrix ===
This is a table of the progression of the Bavarian league system by tier since 1963:

Tier	1963–74	1974–81	1981–88	1988–94	1994–98	1998–2008	2008–12	2012–
I	Bundesliga							
II	Regionalliga Süd	2nd Bundesliga Süd	2nd Bundesliga					
III	Bayernliga				Regionalliga Süd		3rd Liga	
IV	Landesliga				Bayernliga		Regionalliga Süd	Regionalliga Bayern
V	Bezirksliga			Bezirksoberliga	Landesliga		Bayernliga	
VI	A-Klasse			Bezirksliga	Bezirksoberliga		Landesliga	
VII	B-Klasse			A-Klasse	Bezirksliga		Bezirksoberliga	Bezirksliga
VIII	C-Klasse			B-Klasse	A-Klasse	Kreisliga	Bezirksliga	Kreisliga
IX	—			C-Klasse	B-Klasse	Kreisklasse	Kreisliga	Kreisklasse
X	—				C-Klasse	A-Klasse	Kreisklasse	A-Klasse
XI	—					B-Klasse ^{‡}	A-Klasse	B-Klasse ^{‡}
XII	—					C-Klasse ^{‡}	B-Klasse ^{‡}	C-Klasse ^{‡}
XIII	—						C-Klasse ^{‡}	—

- ^{‡} Since 1998 the B- and C- Klasse exist only in some parts of Bavaria.

League system above the Bavarian level.	Bavarian football league system.	Tiers without league during the designated time period.

== Bavarian Cup ==
Until 2009, the seven Bezirke in Bavaria each played their own cup competition which in turn functioned as qualifier to the German Cup (DFB-Pokal). Starting in 1998 these seven cup-winners advanced to the Bavarian Cup. The two finalists of this competition then advanced to the German Cup.

Since 2009, the regional cup competitions were dissolved and qualifying competitions established instead for the lower amateur leagues. The teams in the higher divisions of Bavarian football entered the enlarged Bavarian Cup directly.

== Reserve teams ==
In 1955, 1. FC Nuremberg Amateure became the first reserve team to enter the Bayernliga, followed by FC Bayern Munich Amateure. Despite this, reserve teams from non-professional clubs were not permitted to enter the league system for many years after that, having to play in parallel reserve leagues with promotion and relegation determined by the performance of the senior team rather than the reserve side.

Regulations were slowly lowered and, in 1980, reserve teams of Landesliga clubs were permitted to enter the league pyramid, too. However, should a club drop out of the Landesliga, its reserve side would have to return to reserve football.

With the introduction of the Bezirksoberliga in 1988, reserve teams from this league were permitted to enter regular league football, too. Some years later, this right was also awarded to Bezirksliga clubs. Bavaria was however slow to allow all reserve sides to enter the league system, differing in this from most other German associations. Eventually, this hurdle was dropped too, but the final decision was awarded to the individual Bezirke. Up to the fourth-lowest level, senior and reserve team can play at the same level, but not in the same league, higher than that reserve teams have to play one level below the senior side.

In between, in 2008, reserve sides lost their right to compete in the cup competitions. Since the 2011–12 season, Swabia, Lower Bavaria, Lower Franconia and Upper Franconia have gradually integrated many reserve teams fully into the league system while the other three Bezirke have all the reserves.

Professional clubs often designate their reserve sides to be under-23 teams as the rules of utilising players in both the first and second them for under-23 players are less strict, with players above 23 having to have a mandatory 10-day break when being exchanged between teams.

== Women's and youth leagues ==
Apart from the men's leagues, the Bavarian FA also operates league systems of women's and male and female youth leagues.

In the women's league system, the Bayernliga, the fourth tier of the German league system, is set as the highest state league, with two regional Landesligas below, north and south. Below those, the Bezirksoberligas are set, followed by Bezirksligas, Kreisligas and Kreisklasses, just like the men's. No league exists below the Kreisklasse. Additionally, a women's youth league system also exists with the Under 17 Bayernliga as its highest tier.

In the men's youth league system, both in the Under 19's and Under 17's, the Bayernliga forms the top-tier which is the second division of German youth football. Below the Bayernliga, two Landesligas and seven Bezirksoberligas are set followed by the standard league system. The Under 15's differ in as much as the Bayernliga is split into two regional divisions and set underneath the Southern German Regionalliga. Below the two Bayernligas, Bezirksoberligas are set, followed by the standard league system.

In the Under 13's and below, not all statewide leagues exist, with competitions being very regional.

The top-level leagues in Bavaria since 2011–12 are:

Group	League	Tier
Men	Bayernliga	V
Women	Women's Bayernliga	IV
Under 19 boys	Under 19 Bayernliga	II
Under 17 boys	Under 17 Bayernliga	II
Under 17 girls	Girls Under 17 Bayernliga	I
Under 15 boys	Under 15 Bayernliga ^{1}	II
Under 15 girls	Girls Under 17 Bezirksoberliga ^{2}	I
Under 13 boys	Under 13 Bezirksoberliga	I

- ^{1} In two regional divisions.
- ^{2} Only exists in some regions.
