= Ünal Tosun =

German football manager and player (born 1992)

Personal information
- Date of birth: 5 October 1992 (age 34)
- Place of birth: Munich, Germany
- Height: 1.80 m (5 ft 11 in)
- Position: Attacking midfielder

Team information
- Current team: TSV Landsberg
- Number: 10

Youth career
- ESV Laim
- TSV Gilching-Argelsried
- –2009: SC Fürstenfeldbruck
- 2009–2011: SpVgg Unterhaching

Senior career*
Years	Team	Apps	(Gls)
2011–2012	SpVgg Unterhaching II	43	(14)
2012–2014	FC Unterföhring	46	(19)
2013	FC Unterföhring II	1	(0)
2014–2016	Jahn Regensburg II	58	(5)
2016–2018	FC Pipinsried	54	(9)
2018–2025	Türkgücü München	170	(16)
2025–	TSV Landsberg	17	(1)

Managerial career
- 2025: Türkgücü München (player-coach)
- * Club domestic league appearances and goals as of 24 September 2026

Ünal Tosun (born 5 October 1992) is a German footballer and coach who plays as an attacking midfielder for Regionalliga Bayern club TSV Landsberg. He has formerly acted as player-coach for Türkgücü München.

== Career ==
Tosun grew up in Munich and first played street football before joining local clubs ESV Laim, TSV Gilching-Argelsried and SC Fürstenfeldbruck. As a teenager he also featured for the Harras Bulls, one of the most successful sides in the buntkicktgut integration project, before entering the academy of SpVgg Unterhaching in 2009. During the 2011–12 campaign he appeared for Unterhaching's reserve side in the Bayernliga, the second tier of football in Bavaria, and the fifth level overall in German football. He made his debut on 23 July 2011 in a goalless draw with SC Eltersdorf, and scored his first goal a week later in a 2–2 draw against TSV Rain am Lech. The following summer he moved within the division to FC Unterföhring, making his first appearance in a 1–0 victory over TSV Schwabmünchen on 1 September 2012. Over the next two seasons he made 46 appearances and scored 19 goals.

In March 2014, Tosun moved to the reserve team of SSV Jahn Regensburg, competing in the northern section of the Bayernliga. He made his debut on 1 March 2014 in a 3–1 defeat to SpVgg Jahn Forchheim. After two years at Regensburg, he briefly moved to Turkey, signing with a third-division club in İzmir, but terminated his contract after a few weeks. He subsequently returned to the Bayernliga Süd, joining FC Pipinsried ahead of the 2016–17 season. He featured for the club for the first time on 27 August in a 2–0 win against SV Kirchanschöring, and went on to play a central role in a successful campaign that concluded with promotion to the Regionalliga Bayern, secured through victory over Greuther Fürth II in the play-offs. Tosun retained his place as a regular starter following promotion.

In 2018, he rejoined the Bayernliga Süd, this time with Türkgücü München. He made his debut on 18 July in a 4–1 win against TSV Kottern, and opened his account for the club in a 2–2 draw with TSV Nördlingen. Türkgücü were promoted to the Regionalliga Bayern at the end of the 2018–19 season, before earning a historic promotion to the 3. Liga the following year. Tosun made his professional league debut on 1 November 2020 in a 1–1 draw with FC Ingolstadt, coming on as a substitute for Filip Kusić in the 72nd minute. He went on to make 26 appearances during his first season at that level.

Following Türkgücü's subsequent relegation to the Bayernliga, and the resignation of newly appointed head coach Slaven Skeledžić after only three matches, Tosun—by then serving as club captain—was named player-manager in August 2025. He took charge of eleven league matches in the role before leaving the club. In January 2026, during the winter break, Tosun joined fellow Bayernliga Süd club TSV Landsberg, reuniting with its coach Christoph Rech, a former Türkgücü colleague. Landsberg won promotion to the Regionalliga Bayern at the end of the 2025–26 season, finishing as runners-up to the ineligible reserve side 1860 Munich II.

== Style of play ==
A technically gifted midfielder, Tosun has been described by coaches as industrious and resilient, with strong stamina and an ability to make penetrating runs from deep positions. He has attributed his late rise to professional football to a change in attitude and maturity, noting that he 'always had the talent, but not the mindset' required at a higher level.

== Personal life ==
Tosun was born in Munich and is of Turkish descent.
