= Skeledžić =

Skeledžić is a surname of Croatian origin. Notable people with the surname include:

- Goran Skeledžić (born 1969), Croatian football
- Slaven Skeledžić (born 1971), German-Bosnian football manager
