= TSV Eching =

German football club

- Full name: Turn- und Sportverein Eching e.V.
- Founded: 1947
- Ground: Willi-Wildhopf-Stadion
- Chairman: Gerhard Kytka
- Manager: Janis Hoffmann
- League: Landesliga Bayern-Südost (VI)
- 2015–16: 13th
Home colours	Away colours

TSV Eching is a German association football club from the municipality of Eching, located north of Munich, Bavaria. Established in 1947 as a football team, TSV today includes a winter sports department.

== History ==
The football team spent their first three decades in Kreisliga and Bezirksliga play before winning promotion to the Landesliga Bayern-Süd (V) in 1981. Two seasons later the team again advanced, this time to the Oberliga Bayern (IV) for just a single season. TSV made another single season Oberliga appearance in 1985 before returning once again and this time staying up until 1993.

After being relegated, the club remained part of the Landesliga Bayern-Süd for the next 12 seasons before slipping to the Bezirksoberliga Oberbayern (VI) in 2005 and the Bezirksliga Oberbayern-Nord (VII) in 2007. They rebounded in the following seasons to make a return to the Landesliga (VI) in 2009–10, but finished 17th. In 2011, the team played in the Landesliga Bayern-Süd, after taking out a championship in the Bezirksoberliga Oberbayern (VII) in 2010–11. At the end of the 2011–12 season the club qualified for the promotion round to the newly expanded Bayernliga. A first round loss to SV Pullach however meant the club would remain in the Landesliga instead.

== Honours ==
The club's honours:

- Landesliga Bayern-Süd
  - Champions: 1983, 1990
  - Runners-up: 1985, 1995
- Bezirksoberliga Oberbayern
  - Champions: 2011
  - Runners-up: 2009
- Bezirksliga Oberbayern-Nord
  - Champions: 1980, 1981, 1988, 2008

== Recent seasons ==
The recent season-by-season performance of the club:

Season	Division	Tier	Position
1999–2000	Landesliga Bayern-Süd	V	14th
2000–01	Landesliga Bayern-Süd	V	4th
2001–02	Landesliga Bayern-Süd	V	11th
2002–03	Landesliga Bayern-Süd	V	8th
2003–04	Landesliga Bayern-Süd	V	17th
2004–05	Landesliga Bayern-Süd	V	17th ↓
2005–06	Bezirksoberliga Oberbayern	VI	8th
2006–07	Bezirksoberliga Oberbayern	VI	15th ↓
2007–08	Bezirksliga Oberbayern-Nord	VII	1st ↑
2008–09	Bezirksoberliga Oberbayern	VII	2nd ↑
2009–10	Landesliga Bayern-Süd	VI	17th ↓
2010–11	Bezirksoberliga Oberbayern	VII	1st ↑
2011–12	Landesliga Bayern-Süd	VI	14th
2012–13	Landesliga Bayern-Südost	VI	7th
2013–14	Landesliga Bayern-Südost	VI	11th
2014–15	Landesliga Bayern-Südost	VI	9th
2015–16	Landesliga Bayern-Südost	VI	13th
2016–17	Landesliga Bayern-Südost	VI	

- With the introduction of the Bezirksoberligas in 1988 as the new fifth tier, below the Landesligas, all leagues below dropped one tier. With the introduction of the Regionalligas in 1994 and the 3. Liga in 2008 as the new third tier, below the 2. Bundesliga, all leagues below dropped one tier. With the establishment of the Regionalliga Bayern as the new fourth tier in Bavaria in 2012 the Bayernliga was split into a northern and a southern division, the number of Landesligas expanded from three to five and the Bezirksoberligas abolished. All leagues from the Bezirksligas onwards were elevated one tier.

↑ Promoted	↓ Relegated
