= Türkgücü München =

German association football club

- Full name: Türkgücü München e.V.
- Founded: 2009; 17 years ago as SV Türkgücü-Ataspor
- Ground: Bezirkssportanlage Heinrich-Wieland-Straße
- Capacity: 3,000
- Chairman: Taşkın Akkay
- Manager: Slaven Skeledžić
- League: Landesliga Bayern Südost (VI)
- 2025–26: Bayernliga Süd, 17th of 17 (relegated)
- Website: turkgucu.de
Home colours	Away colours	Third colours

Türkgücü München (lit. 'Turkish Power Munich') is a German association football club from Munich, Bavaria. The current entity was formed in 2009 through the merger of the Türkischer SV München and SV Ataspor München, and traces its identity to SV Türk Gücü München, a migrant club founded in 1975 that folded in insolvency in 2001; it took its present name in 2019. Relegated after finishing bottom of the 2025–26 Bayernliga Süd, the club dropped to the sixth-tier Landesliga Bayern Südost of the German football league system.

Backed from 2016 by the businessman Hasan Kivran, Türkgücü rose four divisions in a decade, winning promotions to the Bayernliga in 2018, the Regionalliga Bayern in 2019 and the nationwide professional 3. Liga in 2020, the last secured after it led the COVID-19-curtailed 2019–21 Regionalliga Bayern. The promotion was widely noted, kicker describing Türkgücü as the first club with a migrant background in German professional football. The club played two seasons in the 3. Liga before mounting debts forced it into insolvency proceedings in January 2022; it withdrew from the division that March and its results were annulled. The association resumed in the Regionalliga Bayern for 2022–23, but the recovery was short-lived. In May 2025 the Bavarian Football Association withdrew the club's licence for the following season after it failed to meet financial and organisational conditions, confirming its relegation to the fifth-tier Bayernliga Süd. The 2025–26 campaign brought further turmoil—a coaching resignation over unpaid wages, a temporary exclusion from competition, and a lawsuit by the city of Munich over unpaid stadium rent—and the club finished bottom of the Bayernliga Süd.

Türkgücü played its 3. Liga home matches at the Olympiastadion and the Grünwalder Stadion, the latter shared with 1860 Munich and Bayern Munich II; after returning to the regional game it lacked a settled home, using the Grünwalder Stadion and later the Dantestadion before its own ground on the Heinrich-Wieland-Straße. The club plays in red and white, the colours of the Turkish flag, and is described as the third force in Munich football behind Bayern and 1860.

== History ==
=== SV Türk Gücü ===
The club was formed in November 1975 by a handful of Turkish migrant workers in Munich, then under the name of SV Türk Gücü München (English: Turkish Power Munich). Originally, the football team played in the lowest tiers of Munich amateur football, something that changed from 1983 onwards, when a number of wealthy Turkish businessmen took over the running of the club. The club found the Bezirksportanlage am Krehlebogen as a permanent home ground and was able to establish a youth department.

Türk Gücü, as the club was commonly referred to, earned a number of promotions, culminating in a 3–1 promotion decider victory over VfR Neuburg, played in front of 3,000 spectators, which earned the club entry to the fourth division Landesliga Bayern-Süd.

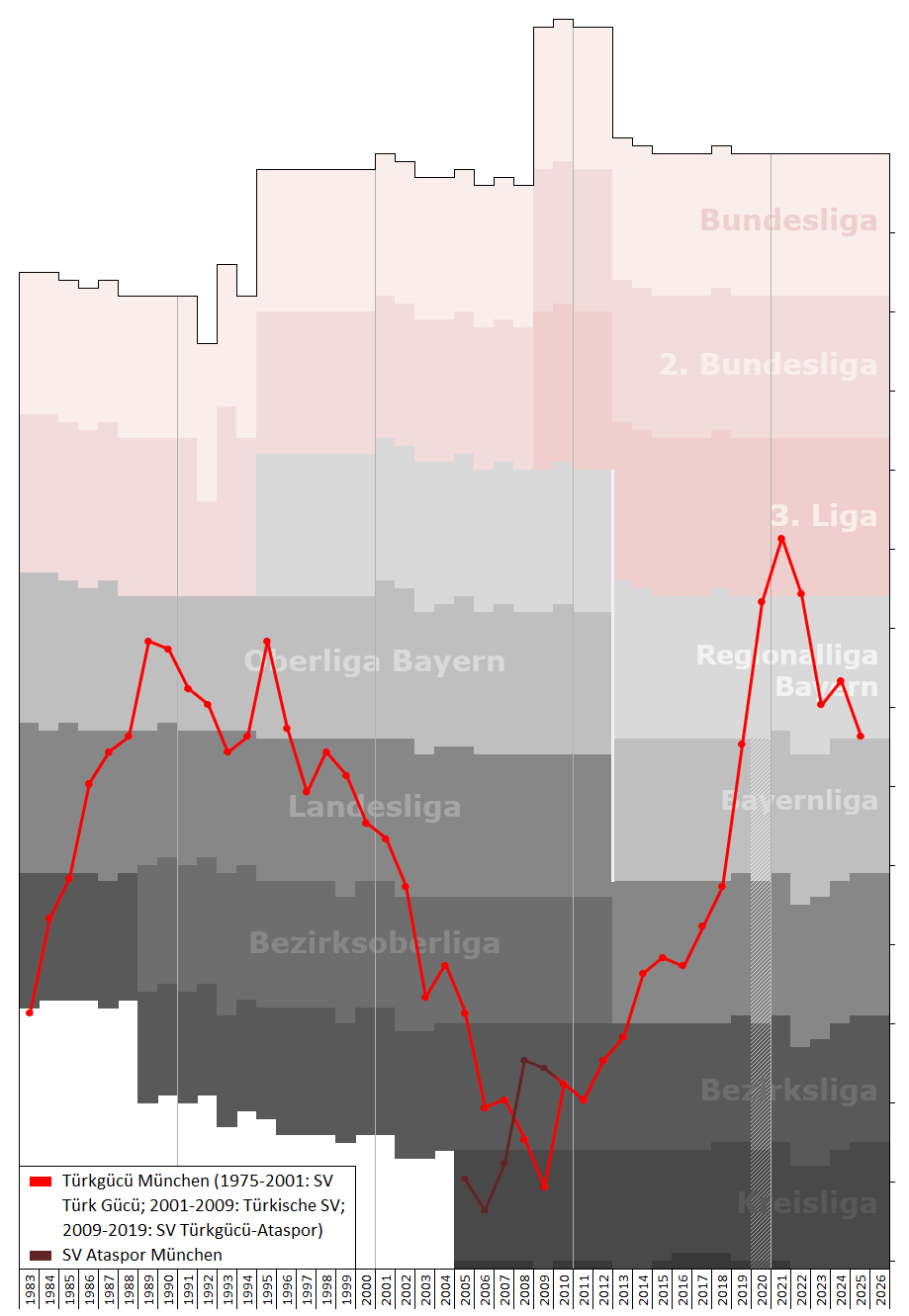
Historical chart of the club's league performance

After its promotion to the Landesliga, Türk Gücü strengthened its team with non-Turkish players and, under coach Peter Grosser, the club won promotion to the Bayernliga in 1988, with future professionals like Gerry Hillringhaus and Thomas Kristl in the team. Türk Gücü was an instant success in Bavaria's highest football league, coming sixth in its first season, where it attracted as many as 12,000 spectators in the games against TSV 1860 Munich. The club was able to draw on up to 1,000 fans to travel with the team to away games. Hillringhaus, a goalie, scored Germany's goal of the month for September 1989 in a Bayernliga game against MTV Ingolstadt.

The club under chairman Ergun Berksoy, rivaled in its success in the German Turkish community only by Türkiyemspor Berlin, begun to aim even for professional football, hoping to earn promotion to the 2. Bundesliga. But the club was not able to live up to its ambitions. It finished seventh in the league in the following year, followed by a twelfth place in 1991 and relegation in 1992 after a bitter 4–3 defeat on penalties in the relegation decider against SC 08 Bamberg.

Fundamental changes started to affect the club. Support for the team had steadily declined, one reason being the large number of non-Turkish players in the club which affected the identification of the local Turkish population with the club. The other was the rise of Satellite television. Being able to watch Turkish giants Beşiktaş, Galatasaray and Fenerbahçe live on TV greatly reduced the number of Turkish people interested in seeing a third- or fourth-division side on the field and, consequently, the club's financial means. Nevertheless, the club's significance in Bavarian football was demonstrated in the fact that the Bavarian Football Associations fiftieth anniversary book had its own two-page article on Türk Gücü, something only awarded to Bavarian giants FC Bayern, TSV 1860, 1. FC Nürnberg and rising star SpVgg Unterhaching.

After the 1995–96 season Türk Gücü came second-last and fell to the fifth tier of German football. The club came close to promotion once more in 1998, when it finished second in its league but lost to 1. FC Nürnberg Amateure in the first round of the promotion matches.

The glory days of Türk Gücü were definitely over now and, in 2001, having become insolvent, the club was dissolved.

=== Türkischer SV ===
Players from Türk Gücü formed a new club called Türkischer SV 1975 München. The new team was not competitive in the Landesliga in 2001–02, finishing second to last, with only SV Lohhof behind it, another club who had only recently played at a much higher level. The team spent three seasons in the sixth tier Bezirksoberliga Oberbayern before another relegation in 2005 took it down to the Bezirksliga level.

The side played in the eastern division of this league, the Bezirksliga Oberbayern-Ost, but again as a lower table side with another relegation following in 2008, the season ATA Spor München entered the league and finished fifth.

Türkischer SV spent its last season before the merger, 2008–09, in the tier-nine Kreisliga München 3, where it achieved its only single-digit league finish in its eighth season of existence.

=== ATA Spor ===
ATA Spor München was formed in 1981.

Unlike Türk Gücü, ATA Spor had never climbed the heights of Bavarian amateur football and promotion from the tier-eight Kreisliga followed by two seasons in the Bezirksliga just before the merger were the club's most successful era.

=== SV Türkgücü-Ataspor ===
On 19 May 2009, ATA Spor and Türkischer SV merged to form SV Türkgücü-Ataspor in an effort to combine the strength of the two clubs and form a strong side in the eastern suburbs of Munich. The new club had a membership of approximately 500 people.

The new club took up ATA Spor's place in the Bezirksliga Oberbayern-Nord, where it came eighth in 2010 and tenth in 2011, a long way from the glory days of the old Türk Gücü club.

In 2013, the club finished second and, via the promotion round, earned promotion to the Landesliga Bayern-Südost.

In 2019, the club finished first in the Bayernliga Süd and earned promotion to the fourth-tier Regionalliga Bayern.

=== Türkgücü München ===
After promotion, the club decided to shorten its name to Türkgücü München. Türkgücu were promoted to 3. Liga in 2020 and played its home games at Grünwalder Stadion. For the 2020–21 season, the team has played their home matches at the Olympiastadion and at Grünwalder Stadion, sharing the latter stadium with their fellow 3. Liga side 1860 Munich.

Türkgücü Munich filed for insolvency on 31 January 2022. Consequently, their season's results were expunged and they were relegated back to the Regionalliga.

=== Return to the Regionalliga and decline (2022–present) ===
Following the 3. Liga withdrawal and the liquidation of the operating company, the registered association (e. V.) again became the licence holder, and the club restarted in the fourth tier under a new board chaired by Taşkın Akkay. In May 2022 the Bavarian Football Association (BFV) granted Türkgücü a conditional licence for the Regionalliga Bayern, and Alper Kayabunar—at the club since 2014 and most recently assistant to Andreas Heraf—was appointed head coach. The club retained its place in the division over the following two seasons.

On 12 May 2025 the BFV withdrew Türkgücü's licence for the 2025–26 Regionalliga season after it failed to satisfy conditions attached to its entry by the 2 May deadline; under the competition's regulations the club was placed bottom of the table and confirmed as relegated. The club was in any case bound for relegation on sporting grounds, a 5–0 home defeat by Bayern Munich II having already sealed the drop and ended Kayabunar's tenure. In the closing weeks Türkgücü forfeited several fixtures for want of a playable stadium, with the points awarded to its opponents.

Demoted to the fifth-tier Bayernliga Süd, the club lost all but four players from its Regionalliga squad—captain Ünal Tosun, goalkeeper Felix Thiel, Fatjon Celani and Dominik Kurija—and opened the 2025–26 season with three successive defeats, no points and a goal difference of 0–10. Head coach Slaven Skeledžić, a former assistant to Miroslav Klose, resigned after three matchdays, alleging organisational disorder and saying that contractually agreed wages had not been paid since his arrival; a board member said the club regretted his departure. He was succeeded by Tosun as player-coach and, from early 2026, by Rainer Elfinger.

The club's finances continued to draw attention. On 10 October 2025 the Bavarian State Sports Association (BLSV) temporarily barred Türkgücü from competition over unpaid dues, a suspension the BFV lifted on 15 October. Separately, the city of Munich sued the club over more than €100,000 in unpaid stadium rent, chiefly for use of the Grünwalder Stadion during the 2022–23 season; after Türkgücü did not respond to the claim, a default judgment was issued in the city's favour in October 2025. Bottom of the table for most of the campaign, the club suffered relegation to the sixth-tier Landesliga Bayern at the end of the season.

== Honours ==
The club's honours:

=== League ===
- Regionalliga Bayern (IV)
  - Promoted: 2019–20
- Bayernliga Süd (V)
  - Champions: 2018–19
- Landesliga Bayern-Südost (VI)
  - Champions: 2017–18
- Landesliga Bayern-Süd (V)
  - Champions: 1987–88, 1993–94
  - Runners-up: 1997–98
- Bezirksliga Oberbayern-Nord (VII)
  - Runners-up: 2012–13
- Kreisliga 3 Schmid (VIII)
  - Runners-up: 2006–07

=== Cup ===
- Bavarian Cup
  - Winners: 2021

== Recent seasons ==
The recent season-by-season performance of the club and its predecessors:

=== SV Türk Gücü ===
Season	Division	Tier	Position
1999–2000	Landesliga Bayern-Süd	V	11th
2000–01	Landesliga Bayern-Süd	V	13th

=== Türkischer SV ===
Season	Division	Tier	Position
2001–02	Landesliga Bayern-Süd	V	19th ↓
2002–03	Bezirksoberliga Oberbayern	VI	13th
2003–04	Bezirksoberliga Oberbayern	VI	9th
2004–05	Bezirksoberliga Oberbayern	VI	15th ↓
2005–06	Bezirksliga Oberbayern-Ost	VII	11th
2006–07	Bezirksliga Oberbayern-Ost	VII	10th
2007–08	Bezirksliga Oberbayern-Ost	VII	15th ↓
2008–09	Kreisliga 3 Schmid	IX	5th

=== ATA Spor ===
Season	Division	Tier	Position
2004–05	Kreisliga 2 Moossmann	VIII	4th
2005–06	Kreisliga 2 Moossmann	VIII	8th
2006–07	Kreisliga 3 Schmid	VIII	2nd ↑
2007–08	Bezirksliga Oberbayern-Ost	VII	5th
2008–09	Bezirksliga Oberbayern-Nord	VIII	6th

=== SV Türkgücü-Ataspor ===
Season	Division	Tier	Position
2009–10	Bezirksliga Oberbayern-Nord	VIII	8th
2010–11	Bezirksliga Oberbayern-Nord	VIII	10th
2011–12	Bezirksliga Oberbayern-Nord	VIII	5th
2012–13	Bezirksliga Oberbayern-Nord	VII	2nd ↑
2013–14	Landesliga Bayern-Südost	VI	12th
2014–15	Landesliga Bayern-Südost	VI	10th
2015–16	Landesliga Bayern-Südost	VI	12th
2016–17	Landesliga Bayern-Südost	VI	6th
2017–18	Landesliga Bayern-Südost	VI	1st ↑
2018–19	Bayernliga Süd	V	1st ↑

=== Türkgücü München ===
Season	Division	Tier	Position
2019–20	Regionalliga Bayern	IV	1st ↑
2020–21	3. Liga	III	13th
2021–22	3. Liga	III	20th ↓
2022–23	Regionalliga Bayern	IV	14th
2023–24	Regionalliga Bayern	IV	11th
2024–25	Regionalliga Bayern	IV	18th ↓
2025–26	Bayernliga Süd	V	17th ↓
2026–27	Landesliga Bayern-Südost	VI	

- With the introduction of the Bezirksoberligas in 1988 as the new fifth tier, below the Landesligas, all leagues below dropped one tier. With the introduction of the Regionalligas in 1994 and the 3. Liga in 2008 as the new third tier, below the 2. Bundesliga, all leagues below dropped one tier. With the establishment of the Regionalliga Bayern as the new fourth tier in Bavaria in 2012 the Bayernliga was split into a northern and a southern division, the number of Landesligas expanded from three to five and the Bezirksoberligas abolished. All leagues from the Bezirksligas onwards were elevated one tier.

↑ Promoted	↓ Relegated
