= BSC Sendling =

German football club

- Full name: Ballspielclub Sendling 1918 München e.V.
- Founded: 1918
- Ground: Städtische Bezirkssportanlage Sendling-Westpark
- Manager: Pitari Maurizio
- League: Kreisklasse München 3 (IX)
- 2015–16: 8th
| Home colours | Away colours |

The BSC Sendling is a German association football club from the Munich suburb of Sendling, Bavaria.

The club's most notable era was between 1954 and 1974 when it spent six seasons in the Bayernliga, then the third tier of the German football league system.

== History ==
BSC Sendling was formed in 1948 in a merger of two local clubs, Münchener Ballspielclubs and SpVgg Sendling 1918.

The club first entered the southern division of the Bayernliga in 1954 and spend the next four seasons at this level with an eighth place in 1955–56 as its best result. At the end of the 1957–58 season Sendling was relegated back to the 2. Anmatuerliga.

After not qualifying for the new Landesliga Bayern-Süd in 1963 the club took until 1969 to win promotion to this league, after a title in the Bezirksliga Oberbayern-Nord. BSC played three excellent seasons at this level, finishing fifth and second before winning the league in 1972. The later allowed the side to return to the Bayerliga, now a single division league. BSC Sendling spend two more seasons at this level, coming 14th in its first year before being relegated in 1974 after a 16th place. Back in the Landesliga the club was immediately relegated again after an 18th place, now to the Bezirksliga Oberbayern-Süd. It played at this level until 1978 before suffering another relegation.

Sendling returned to higher league football in 1991 when it won promotion to the Bezirksoberliga Oberbayern after a Bezirksliga Oberbayern-Süd title. It won this league in its first attempt and earned promotion to the Landesliga for a second time. Another 18th-place finish in this league in 1992–93 however meant instant relegation, followed by drop out of the Bezirksoberliga the season after when it could only finish 17th there. BSC Sendling returned to the Bezirksoberiga for two more seasons in 1996 but was relegated again in 1998. The following season, 1998–99, the club was relegated from the Bezirksliga as well, playing in local Munich football after this.

BSC Sendling has since fluctuated between the Kreiliga and the Kreisklasse. After a season in the Kreisliga in 2013–14 in which BSC was relegated alongside FC Wacker München, another former great of Munich football, the club now plays in the tier nine Kreisklasse.

== Honours ==
The club's honours:

- Landesliga Bayern-Süd
  - Champions: 1972
  - Runners-up: 1971
- Bezirksoberliga Oberbayern
  - Champions: 1992
- Bezirksliga Oberbayern-Süd
  - Champions: 1991, 1996
- Bezirksliga Oberbayern-Nord
  - Champions: 1969
- 2. Amateurliga Oberbayern A
  - Champions: 1954

== Recent seasons ==
The recent season-by-season performance of the club:

| Season | Division | Tier | Position |
|---|---|---|---|
| 2007–08 | Kreisliga München 2 | VIII | 4th |
| 2008–09 | Kreisliga München 2 | IX | 13th ↓ |
| 2009–10 | Kreisklasse München 3 | X | 10th |
| 2010–11 | Kreisklasse München 3 | X | 9th |
| 2011–12 | Kreisklasse München 3 | X | 11th |
| 2012–13 | Kreisklasse München 3 | IX | 1st ↑ |
| 2013–14 | Kreisliga München 2 | VIII | 13th ↓ |
| 2014–15 | Kreisklasse München 3 | IX | 2nd |
| 2015–16 | Kreisklasse München 3 | IX | 8th |
| 2016–17 | Kreisklasse München 3 | IX | |

- With the introduction of the Bezirksoberligas in 1988 as the new fifth tier, below the Landesligas, all leagues below dropped one tier. With the introduction of the Regionalligas in 1994 and the 3. Liga in 2008 as the new third tier, below the 2. Bundesliga, all leagues below dropped one tier. With the establishment of the Regionalliga Bayern as the new fourth tier in Bavaria in 2012 the Bayernliga was split into a northern and a southern division, the number of Landesligas expanded from three to five and the Bezirksoberligas abolished. All leagues from the Bezirksligas onwards were elevated one tier.

=== Key ===
| ↑ Promoted | ↓ Relegated |
