= TSV Großhadern =

Association football club

- Full name: Turn- und Sportverein München-Großhadern von 1926 e.V.
- Founded: 1926
- Ground: Heiglhofstraße
- Capacity: 1,000
- Manager: Herbert Scherer
- League: Kreisliga München (VIII)
- 2015–16: Bezirksliga Oberbayern-Süd (VII), 13th (relegated)
Home colours	Away colours

TSV Großhadern is a German sports club from the city of Munich, Bavaria. The club has a membership of over 3,000 and in addition to its football side it has departments for Aikido, climbing, fitness, gymnastics, handball, Judo, tennis, and volleyball.

== History ==
The club was established in 1926 as the gymnastics club Turnverein Großhadern. On 1 January 1934 the club grew with the addition of the former membership of Fußball Club 1932 Hadern, which led to the creation of a football department within TV. In 1948, the club was renamed Turn- und Sportverein Großhadern.

Following a Landesliga title, TSV played a single season in the Amateuroberliga Bayern (III) in 1986–87 and was relegated after finishing 17th. Between 2007 and 2010, the team played as a lower table side in the Landesliga Bayern-Süd (VI). In 2011–12 they competed in the Bezirksliga Oberbayern-Süd (VII) but were relegated once more, now to the Kreisliga, after finishing 13th.

Großhadern spend only one season at Kreisliga level before a league championship earned the club promotion back to the Bezirksliga. After three Bezirksliga seasons as a lower table side the club was relegated back to the Kreisliga in 2016.

== Honours ==
The club's honours:

- Landesliga Bayern-Süd
  - Champions: 1986
- Bezirksoberliga Oberbayern
  - Champions: 1994, 2005
- Bezirksliga Oberbayern-Süd
  - Champions: 2004
- Kreisliga München 2
  - Champions: 2013

== Recent seasons ==
The recent season-by-season performance of the club:

Season	Division	Tier	Position
1999–2000	Bezirksoberliga Oberbayern	VI	8th
2000–01	Bezirksoberliga Oberbayern	VI	5th
2001–02	Bezirksoberliga Oberbayern	VI	14th ↓
2002–03	Bezirksliga Oberbayern-Süd	VII	
2003–04	Bezirksliga Oberbayern-Süd	VII	1st ↑
2004–05	Bezirksoberliga Oberbayern	VI	1st ↑
2005–06	Landesliga Bayern-Süd	V	10th
2006–07	Landesliga Bayern-Süd	V	7th
2007–08	Landesliga Bayern-Süd	V	11th
2008–09	Landesliga Bayern-Süd	VI	15th
2009–10	Landesliga Bayern-Süd	VI	18th ↓
2010–11	Bezirksoberliga Oberbayern	VII	15th ↓
2011–12	Bezirksliga Oberbayern-Süd	VIII	13th ↓
2012–13	Kreisliga München 2	VIII	1st ↑
2013–14	Bezirksliga Oberbayern-Süd	VII	10th
2014–15	Bezirksliga Oberbayern-Süd	VII	13th
2015–16	Bezirksliga Oberbayern-Süd	VII	13th ↓
2016–17	Kreisliga München	VIII	

- With the introduction of the Bezirksoberligas in 1988 as the new fifth tier, below the Landesligas, all leagues below dropped one tier. With the introduction of the Regionalligas in 1994 and the 3. Liga in 2008 as the new third tier, below the 2. Bundesliga, all leagues below dropped one tier. With the establishment of the Regionalliga Bayern as the new fourth tier in Bavaria in 2012 the Bayernliga was split into a northern and a southern division, the number of Landesligas expanded from three to five and the Bezirksoberligas abolished. All leagues from the Bezirksligas onwards were elevated one tier.

↑ Promoted	↓ Relegated
