= Bezirksliga Oberbayern-Süd =

- Founded: 1963
- Country: Germany
- State: Bavaria
- Number of clubs: 15
- Level on pyramid: Level 7
- Promotion to: Landesliga
- Relegation to: Kreisliga Zugspitze 1; Kreisliga Zugspitze 2; Kreisliga München 2
- Current champions: TSV Brunnthal (2019–21)

The Bezirksliga Oberbayern-Süd (English: District league Upper Bavaria-South) is currently the seventh tier of the German football league system in the southern part of the Bavarian Regierungsbezirk of Upper Bavaria (German: Oberbayern). Until the disbanding of the Bezirksoberliga Oberbayern in 2012 it was the eighth tier. From 2008, when the 3. Liga was introduced, was the seventh tier of the league system, until the introduction of the Regionalligas in 1994 the sixth tier. From the league's inception in 1963 to the introduction of the Bezirksoberliga in 1988 it was the fifth tier.

== Overview ==
=== History ===
Before the Bezirksoberligas in Bavaria were introduced in 1988 the Bezirksligas were the leagues set right below the Landesligas Bayern in the football pyramid from 1963 onwards, when the Landesligas were established. Until the establishment of the Bezirksoberliga, the league champions were not automatically promoted but instead had to play-off for promotion as there was five Bezirksligas feeding the Landesliga but initially only three, later four promotion spots.

In 1988, when the Bezirksoberligas were introduced, the league lost some of its status as it was relegated one tier. On a positive note, the league champions were now always promoted and the league runners-up had the opportunity to play-off for promotion as well.

With the league reform at the end of the 2011–12 season, which included an expansion of the number of Landesligas from three to five, the Bezirksoberligas were disbanded. Instead, the Bezirksligas took the place of the Bezirksoberligas once more below the Landesligas.

The following qualifying modus applied at the end of the 2011–12 season:

- Champions: Promotion round to the Landesliga, winners to the Landesliga, losers to the Bezirksliga.
- Teams placed 2nd to 12th: Remain in the Bezirksliga.
- Teams placed 13th to 16th: Directly relegated to Kreisliga.

=== Format ===
The winner of the Bezirksliga Oberbayern-Süd, like the winner of the Bezirksliga Oberbayern-Nord and Bezirksliga Oberbayern-Ost was, until 2011, directly promoted to the Bezirksoberliga Oberbayern. The runners-up of the Bezirksligas in Upper Bavaria would take part in a promotion round with the best-placed Bezirksoberliga team which did finish on a relegation rank to determine one or more additional promotion spots, depending on availability. From the 2012–13 season onwards, the league champion will be promoted to one of the five Landesligas. Given that the new Landesligas, unlike the old ones, are not geographically fixed the champion could end up in either the Landesliga Bayern-Südwest or the Landesliga Bayern-Südost.

The bottom three teams of each group were relegated to one of the Kreisligas. At the same time the Kreisliga champions were promoted to the Bezirksliga. The runners-up of the Kreisligas faced a play-off with each other and the 12th placed teams in the Bezirksliga.

The Bezirksliga Oberbayern-Süd is fed by the following Kreisligas:

- Kreisliga Zugspitze 1
- Kreisliga Zugspitze 2
- Kreisliga München 2

Since 1995, the league has generally operated with a strength of 16 clubs and rarely deviated from this.

=== League timeline ===
The league went through the following timeline of positions in the league system:

Years	Name	Tier	Promotion to
1963–88	Bezirksliga Oberbayern-Süd	V	Landesliga Bayern-Süd
1988–94	Bezirksliga Oberbayern-Süd	VI	Bezirksoberliga Oberbayern
1994–2008	Bezirksliga Oberbayern-Süd	VII	Bezirksoberliga Oberbayern
2008–12	Bezirksliga Oberbayern-Süd	VIII	Bezirksoberliga Oberbayern
2012–	Bezirksliga Oberbayern-Süd	VII	Landesliga Bayern

== League champions ==
The winners and runners–up of the league:

=== 1963–88 ===
The league champions and runners–up while being a feeder league to the Landesliga:

**Season**	**Champions**	**Runners–up**
1963–64	**TSV Trostberg**	Post SV München
1964–65	**SV Wacker Burghausen**	TV Altötting
1965–66	**TSV Wolfratshausen**	
1966–67	**FC Falke Markt Schwaben**	FC Deisenhofen
1967–68	**TSV Milbertshofen**	FC Deisenhofen
1968–69	**1. FC Garmisch**	TSV Marktl
1969–70	**Eintracht Freising**	BSG Himolla Taufkirchen
1970–71	**FC Moosinning**	MTV 79 München
1971–72	**TSV Herrsching**	ESV München-Laim
1972–73	**SC Unterpfaffenhofen**	SpVgg Starnberg
1973–74	**1. FC Garmisch**	TSV Schongau
1974–75	**SpVgg Starnberg**	TSV Murnau
1975–76	**FC Emmering**	TSV Murnau
1976–77	TSV Weilheim ^{+}	TSV Peißenberg ^{+}
1977–78	**MTV 79 München**	TSV Peißenberg
1978–79	**SpVgg Unterhaching**	TSV Murnau
1979–80	**SV 1880 München**	MTV 79 München
1980–81	**TSV Murnau**	ESV München
1981–82	ESV München	SpVgg Starnberg
1982–83	**SV 1880 München**	ESV München
1983–84	**TSV Großhadern**	SpVgg Starnberg
1984–85	**SpVgg Unterhaching II**	TSV Milbertshofen
1985–86	**SpVgg Starnberg**	**TSV Ottobrunn**
1986–87	**FC Emmering**	FC Penzberg
1987–88	**TSV Grünwald**	**FSV München**

=== 1988–2012 ===
The league champions and runners–up while being a feeder league to the Bezirksoberliga:

**Season**	**Champions**	**Runners–up**
1988–89	**SV Planegg-Krailling**	SVG Trudering
1989–90	**TSV 1860 München II** ^{+}	**ESV Neuaubing** ^{+}
1990–91	**BSC Sendling**	SVG Trudering
1991–92	**SVG Trudering**	**TuS Geretsried**
1992–93	**TSV Trudering**	SV Aubing
1993–94	**SV Raisting**	ESV Neuaubing
1994–95	**FSV München**	**1. FC Garmisch**
1995–96	**BSC Sendling**	**FC Emmering**
1996–97	**SV Pullach**	**SV Germering**
1997–98	**TSV Grünwald**	**SV Aubing**
1998–99	**SV Raisting**	BCF Wolfratshausen ^{+}
1999–2000	**TSV Forstenried**	TSV Gilching-Argelsried
2000–01	**BCF Wolfratshausen**	SC Olching
2001–02	**SC Fürstenfeldbruck II**	1. FC Garmisch
2002–03	**1. FC Miesbach**	SC Olching
2003–04	**TSV Großhadern**	**MTV Berg**
2004–05	**SV Pullach**	SC Oberweikertshofen
2005–06	**SC Olching**	TSV Solln
2006–07	**TuS Holzkirchen**	TSV Gräfelfing
2007–08	**SC Gaißach**	**FC Deisenhofen** ^{+}
2008–09	**SC Olching**	TSV Peiting
2009–10	**TuS Geretsried**	TSV Peiting
2010–11	**TuS Holzkirchen**	SV Raisting
2011–12	SV Planegg-Krailling	TSV Grünwald

=== 2012–present ===
The league champions and runners–up while being a feeder league to the Landesliga once more:

**Season**	Champions	**Runners–up**
2012–13	SC Oberweikertshofen	TSV Grünwald
2013–14	SV Planegg-Krailling	TSV Grünwald
2014–15	TuS Geretsried	TSV Gilching
2015–16	SC Olching	TSV Gilching
2016–17	TSV Grünwald	**TSV Neuried**
2017–18	1. FC Garmisch-Partenkirchen	FC Anadolu Bayern
2018–19	SV Bad Heilbrunn	SVN München
2019–21	TSV Brunnthal	SC Oberweikertshofen

- Promoted teams in **bold**.
- ^{+} Teams finished on equal points, decider needed to determine final position.
- Season was suspended in 2020 and then extended to 2021, when it was curtailed. Champion and runner-up were ranked on a points per game basis.

== Current clubs ==
The clubs in the league in the 2021–22 season and their 2019–21 final placings:

Club	Position
SC Oberweikertshofen	2nd
FC Penzberg	3rd
BCF Wolfratshausen	4th
TSV Neuried	5th
SV Aubing	6th
SC Pöcking	7th
MTV Berg	8th
SV Raisting	9th
FC Hertha München	10th
FC Kosova München	11th
SC Unterpfaffenhofen	12th
VfL Denklingen	Promoted from the Kreisliga
TSV Großhadern	Promoted from the Kreisliga
SpVgg 1906 Haidhausen	Promoted from the Kreisliga
