= Bezirksliga Oberbayern-Nord =

- Founded: 1963
- Country: Germany
- State: Bavaria
- Number of clubs: 16
- Level on pyramid: Level 7
- Promotion to: Landesliga
- Relegation to: Kreisliga Donau/Isar 1; Kreisliga Donau/Isar 2; Kreisliga München 1
- Current champions: TSV Eching (2019–21)

The Bezirksliga Oberbayern-Nord (English: District league Upper Bavaria-North) is currently the seventh tier of the German football league system in the northern part of the Bavarian Regierungsbezirk of Upper Bavaria (German: Oberbayern). Until the disbanding of the Bezirksoberliga Oberbayern in 2012 it was the eighth tier. From 2008, when the 3. Liga was introduced, was the seventh tier of the league system, until the introduction of the Regionalligas in 1994 the sixth tier. From the league's inception in 1963 to the introduction of the Bezirksoberliga in 1988 it was the fifth tier.

== Overview ==
=== History ===
Before the Bezirksoberligas in Bavaria were introduced in 1988 the Bezirksligas were the leagues set right below the Landesligas Bayern in the football pyramid from 1963 onwards, when the Landesligas were established. Until the establishment of the Bezirksoberliga, the league champions were not automatically promoted but instead had to play-off for promotion as there was five Bezirksligas feeding the Landesliga but initially only three, later four promotion spots. The clubs from Oberbayern-Nord were generally quite successful in the promotion round, only missing out seven times in 25 seasons.

In 1988, when the Bezirksoberligas were introduced, the league lost some of its status as it was relegated one tier. On a positive note, the league champions were now always promoted and the league runners-up had the opportunity to play-off for promotion as well.

When the Bezirksoberliga was established, five clubs from the league gained entry to the new league:

- SpVgg Feldmoching
- VfR Neuburg
- FC Schrobenhausen
- ASV Dachau

With the league reform at the end of the 2011–12 season, which included an expansion of the number of Landesligas from three to five, the Bezirksoberligas were disbanded. Instead, the Bezirksligas took the place of the Bezirksoberligas once more below the Landesligas.

The following qualifying modus applied at the end of the 2011–12 season:

- Champions: Promotion round to the Landesliga, winners to the Landesliga, losers to the Bezirksliga.
- Teams placed 2nd to 12th: Remain in the Bezirksliga.
- Teams placed 13th to 16th: Directly relegated to Kreisliga.

=== Format ===
The winner of the Bezirksliga Oberbayern-Nord, like the winner of the Bezirksliga Oberbayern-Ost and Bezirksliga Oberbayern-Süd was, until 2011, directly promoted to the Bezirksoberliga Oberbayern. The runners-up of the Bezirksligas in Upper Bavaria would take part in a promotion round with the best-placed Bezirksoberliga team which did finish on a relegation rank to determine one or more additional promotion spots, depending on availability. From the 2012–13 season onwards, the league champion will be promoted to one of the five Landesligas. Given that the new Landesligas, unlike the old ones, are not geographically fixed the champion could end up in either the Landesliga Bayern-Mitte, the Landesliga Bayern-Südwest or the Landesliga Bayern-Südost.

The bottom three teams of each group are relegated to one of the Kreisligas. At the same time the Kreisliga champions were promoted to the Bezirksliga. The runners-up of the Kreisligas faced a play-off with each other and the 13th placed teams in the Bezirksliga.

The Bezirksliga Oberbayern-Nord is fed by the following Kreisligas:

- Kreisliga Donau/Isar 1
- Kreisliga Donau/Isar 2
- Kreisliga München 1

The league has generally operated with a strength of 16 clubs since 1982 and rarely deviated from this. The only exceptions were in 1988-89 and 2017–18, when it played with 14 and 15 respectively. Before 1982, the league strength constantly fluctuated between 15 and 16 clubs.

=== League timeline ===
The league went through the following timeline of positions in the league system:

Years	Name	Tier	Promotion to
1963–88	Bezirksliga Oberbayern-Nord	V	Landesliga Bayern-Süd
1988–94	Bezirksliga Oberbayern-Nord	VI	Bezirksoberliga Oberbayern
1994–2008	Bezirksliga Oberbayern-Nord	VII	Bezirksoberliga Oberbayern
2008–12	Bezirksliga Oberbayern-Nord	VIII	Bezirksoberliga Oberbayern
2012–	Bezirksliga Oberbayern-Nord	VII	Landesliga Bayern

== League champions ==
The winners and runners–up of the league:

=== 1963–88 ===
The league champions and runners–up while being a feeder league to the Landesliga:

**Season**	**Champions**	**Runners–up**
1963–64	**TSG Pasing** ^{+}	MTV Ingolstadt ^{+}
1964–65	**MTV Ingolstadt**	TSV Milbertshofen
1965–66	**SV Zuchering**	TSV Milbertshofen
1966–67	**TSV Kösching** ^{+}	FC Emmering ^{+}
1967–68	**SF Pasing 03**	ESV München
1968–69	**BSC Sendling**	SV 1880 München
1969–70	**SC Fürstenfeldbruck**	ESV München
1970–71	**VfR Neuburg**	TSV Schongau
1971–72	SV Untermenzing	SC Gröbenzell
1972–73	TSV Ludwigsfeld ^{+}	ASV Dachau ^{+}
1973–74	SpVgg Feldmoching	TSV Kösching
1974–75	**ASV Dachau**	FC Schrobenhausen
1975–76	FC Schrobenhausen	TSV Rohrbach
1976–77	**TSV Kösching**	Bajuwaren München
1977–78	Bajuwaren München ^{+}	TSG Pasing ^{+}
1978–79	**TSV Rohrbach**	TSV Wolnzach
1979–80	TSV Eching	ESV München
1980–81	**TSV Eching**	TSV Wolnzach
1981–82	**SV Karlshuld**	SV München–Daglfing
1982–83	**SpVgg Feldmoching** ^{+}	Eintracht Freising ^{+}
1983–84	**TSV Gaimersheim**	VfR Neuburg
1984–85	**VfR Neuburg**	SV Lohhof
1985–86	TSV Allach 09	SV Lohhof
1986–87	**TSV Allach 09**	**SV Lohhof**
1987–88	**TSV Eching**	SpVgg Feldmoching

=== 1988–2012 ===
The league champions and runners–up while being a feeder league to the Bezirksoberliga:

**Season**	**Champions**	**Runners–up**
1988–89	**Eintracht Karlsfeld**	FC Ismaning
1989–90	**SV Kranzberg**	VfR Garching
1990–91	**VfR Garching**	TSV Milbertshofen
1991–92	**SV Odelzhausen**	FSV Harthof
1992–93	**FC Croatia München**	TSV Milbertshofen
1993–94	**FC Moosinning**	SpVgg Feldmoching
1994–95	**FSV Pfaffenhofen**	FC Neufahrn
1995–96	**SpVgg Feldmoching**	VfR Neuburg
1996–97	**Eintracht Freising**	FC Neufahrn
1997–98	**ASV Dachau**	FSV Harthof
1998–99	**TSV Milbertshofen**	**FC Neufahrn**
1999–2000	**ESV Ingolstadt**	SpVgg Feldmoching
2000–01	**VfR Neuburg**	**FC SF Eitting**
2001–02	**FC Aschheim**	ASV Dachau
2002–03	**SpVgg Feldmoching**	ASV Dachau
2003–04	**FC Unterföhring**	ASV Dachau
2004–05	**SC Baldham**	Eintracht Karlsfeld
2005–06	**VfB Eichstätt** ^{+}	TSV Rohrbach ^{+}
2006–07	**Eintracht Karlsfeld**	TSV Dachau 65
2007–08	**TSV Eching**	**TSV Kösching**
2008–09	**FC Gerolfing**	**VfR Garching**
2009–10	**BC Attaching**	TSV Dachau 65
2010–11	**SV Manching** ^{+}	TSV Dachau 65 ^{+}
2011–12	**TSV 1865 Dachau**	SV Sulzemoos

=== 2012–present ===
The league champions and runners–up while being a feeder league to the Landesliga once more:

**Season**	Champions	**Runners–up**
2012–13	VfB Hallbergmoos-Goldach	**SV Türkgücü-Ataspor München**
2013–14	ASV Dachau	TSV Jetzendorf
2014–15	SV Manching	TSV Jetzendorf
2015–16	Eintracht Karlsfeld	FC Erding
2016–17	SV Manching	TSV Jetzendorf
2017–18	Eintracht Karlsfeld	**FC Moosinning**
2018–19	Kirchheimer SC	**TSV Jetzendorf**
2019–21	TSV Eching	FC Sportfreunde Schwaig

- Promoted teams in **bold**.
- ^{+} Teams finished on equal points, decider needed to determine final position.
- Season was suspended in 2020 and then extended to 2021, when it was curtailed. Champion and runner-up were ranked on a points per game basis.

=== Multiple winners ===
The following clubs have won the league more than once:

**Club**	**Wins**	**Years**
TSV Eching	5	1980, 1981, 1988, 2008, 2021
Eintracht Karlsfeld	4	1989, 2007, 2016, 2018
SpVgg Feldmoching	4	1974, 1983, 1996, 2003
ASV Dachau	3	1975, 1998, 2014
VfR Neuburg	3	1971, 1985, 2001
TSV Allach 09	2	1986, 1987
TSV Kösching	2	1967, 1977

== Current clubs ==
The clubs in the league in the 2021–22 season and their 2019–21 final placings:

Club	Position
ASV Dachau	Relegated from the Landesliga
TSV Jetzendorf	Relegated from the Landesliga
FC Sportfreunde Schwaig	2nd
TSV Rohrbach	3rd
FC Moosinning	4th
SV Dornach	5th
SpVgg Kammerberg	6th
SpVgg Feldmoching	7th
SV Manching	8th
VfB Eichstätt II	9th
FC Schwabing München	10th
FSV Pfaffenhofen/Ilm	11th
FC Alte Haide-DSC München	12th
SV Ampertal Palzing	13th
SV Kasing	Promoted from the Kreisliga
SV Nord Lerchenau	Promoted from the Kreisliga
