= Daniel Leugner =

German footballer

Personal information
- Date of birth: 8 April 1995 (age 31)
- Place of birth: Germany
- Height: 1.84 m (6 ft 0 in)
- Positions: Defender; midfielder

Team information
- Current team: TSV Landsberg

Senior career*
Years	Team	Apps	(Gls)
2014–2015	FC Augsburg II	2	(0)
2015–2019	SV Pullach	121	(25)
2019–2020	FC Pipinsried	15	(3)
2021–2022	TSV 1865 Dachau	33	(11)
2022–	TSV Landsberg	12	(4)

International career
- Bavaria
- * Club domestic league appearances and goals

Daniel Leugner (born 8 April 1995) is a German footballer who plays as a defender or midfielder for TSV Landsberg.

== Early life ==
Leugner started playing football with German side SV Günding and joined the youth academy of German side TSV 1860 Munich, where he played for the under-19 team, before signing for German side SV Pullach, where he was regarded as one of the club's most important players.

== Club career ==
In 2022, Leugner signed for German side TSV Landsberg, where he suffered an injury but was regarded to have initially played well for the club.

== International career ==
Leugner played for the Bavaria football team at the UEFA Regions Cup.

== Style of play ==
Leugner has operated as a central defender, midfielder, and striker, and is known for his technical ability.

== Personal life ==
Leugner is a native of Bergkirchen, Germany.

In the 2018 version of the videogame Football Manager, he also holds American Samoan nationality.
