= SV Raisting =

- Full name: Sportverein Raisting e.V. 1924
- Founded: 28 May 1924
- Ground: Sportpark Raisting
- Capacity: 1,500
- Chairman: Remigius Happach
- Manager: Robert Färber
- League: Landesliga Bayern-Südwest (VI)
- 2015–16: 9th
Home colours	Away colours

The SV Raisting is a German association football club from the town of Raisting, Bavaria.

The club's greatest success came in 2013, when it qualified for the southern division of the Bayernliga, the fifth tier of the German football league system.

== History ==
SV Raisting, for the most of its history, has been a non-descript amateur side in local Bavarian football. The club was formed in 1924 as Sportabteilung Raisting as part of local club MTV Diessen. Playing only friendlies in the early year the club became independent in 1929 under its current name. Disbanded at the end of the Second World War SV Raisting reformed on 8 July 1946, and entered local football once more in the Zugspitze region. In the following decades the club fluctuated between the lowest division, the C-Klasse, and two levels higher, the A-Klasse. In 1959, SVR faced a crisis that led to the club almost being disbanded but it recovered. It built a new home ground in 1969 with the earth works being carried out by the US Army.

The club won promotion to the Bezirksliga Oberbayern-Süd in 1979 and again in 1991. In 1994, itwon a championship in the Bezirksliga and earned promotion to the Bezirksoberliga.

Raisting played in the Bezirksoberliga Oberbayern, the highest league in Upper Bavaria, for three seasons from 1994 onwards, finishing in the bottom half of the table each year and eventually being relegated again in 1997. After two years in the Bezirksliga the club returned to the Bezirksoberliga again in 1999. The club's second three-season stint in this league was more successful, culminating in promotion to the Landesliga Bayern-Süd in 2002.

The club's first ever Landesliga season was unsuccessful, finishing sixteenth and being relegated again. Four more Bezirksoberliga seasons followed before Raisting returned to the Landesliga for a second time in 2007. On this occasion, Raisting lasted for two seasons before dropping down again in 2009. The club dropped straight from the Landesliga via the Bezirksoberliga to the Bezirksliga and rose back up again to the Bezirksoberliga by 2011. The 2011–12 season was to be the last of the Bezirksoberliga and Raisting, despite only finishing eleventh qualified for the Landesliga, the later having been expanded from three to five divisions.

The club came second in the inaugural season of the Landesliga Bayern-Südwest and, via the promotion round, earned promotion to the Bayernliga. Raisting came eleventh in its first season in the southern division of the Bayernliga in 2013–14. The club finished on a relegation play-off rank in the 2014–15 season and, after losing to FV Illertissen II in the first round, was relegated back to the Landesliga.

== Honours ==
The club's honours:

- Landesliga Bayern-Südwest
  - Runners-up: 2013
- Bezirksoberliga Oberbayern
  - Champions: 2007
  - Runners-up: 2002
- Bezirksliga Oberbayern-Süd
  - Champions: 1994, 1999
  - Runners-up: 2011

== Recent seasons ==
The recent season-by-season performance of the club:

Season	Division	Tier	Position
1999–2000	Bezirksoberliga Oberbayern	VI	10th
2000–01	Bezirksoberliga Oberbayern	VI	9th
2001–02	Bezirksoberliga Oberbayern	VI	2nd ↑
2002–03	Landesliga Bayern-Süd	V	16th ↓
2003–04	Bezirksoberliga Oberbayern	VI	8th
2004–05	Bezirksoberliga Oberbayern	VI	4th
2005–06	Bezirksoberliga Oberbayern	VI	5th
2006–07	Bezirksoberliga Oberbayern	VI	1st ↑
2007–08	Landesliga Bayern-Süd	V	14th
2008–09	Landesliga Bayern-Süd	VI	16th ↓
2009–10	Bezirksoberliga Oberbayern	VII	14th ↓
2010–11	Bezirksliga Oberbayern	VIII	2nd ↑
2011–12	Bezirksoberliga Oberbayern	VII	11th ↑
2012–13	Landesliga Bayern-Südwest	VI	2nd ↑
2013–14	Bayernliga Süd	V	11th
2014–15	Bayernliga Süd	V	17th ↓
2015–16	Landesliga Bayern-Südwest	VI	9th
2016–17	Landesliga Bayern-Südwest	VI	

- With the introduction of the Bezirksoberligas in 1988 as the new fifth tier, below the Landesligas, all leagues below dropped one tier. With the introduction of the Regionalligas in 1994 and the 3. Liga in 2008 as the new third tier, below the 2. Bundesliga, all leagues below dropped one tier. With the establishment of the Regionalliga Bayern as the new fourth tier in Bavaria in 2012 the Bayernliga was split into a northern and a southern division, the number of Landesligas expanded from three to five and the Bezirksoberligas abolished. All leagues from the Bezirksligas onwards were elevated one tier.

=== Key ===
↑ Promoted	↓ Relegated
