= Thomas Kristl =

German footballer

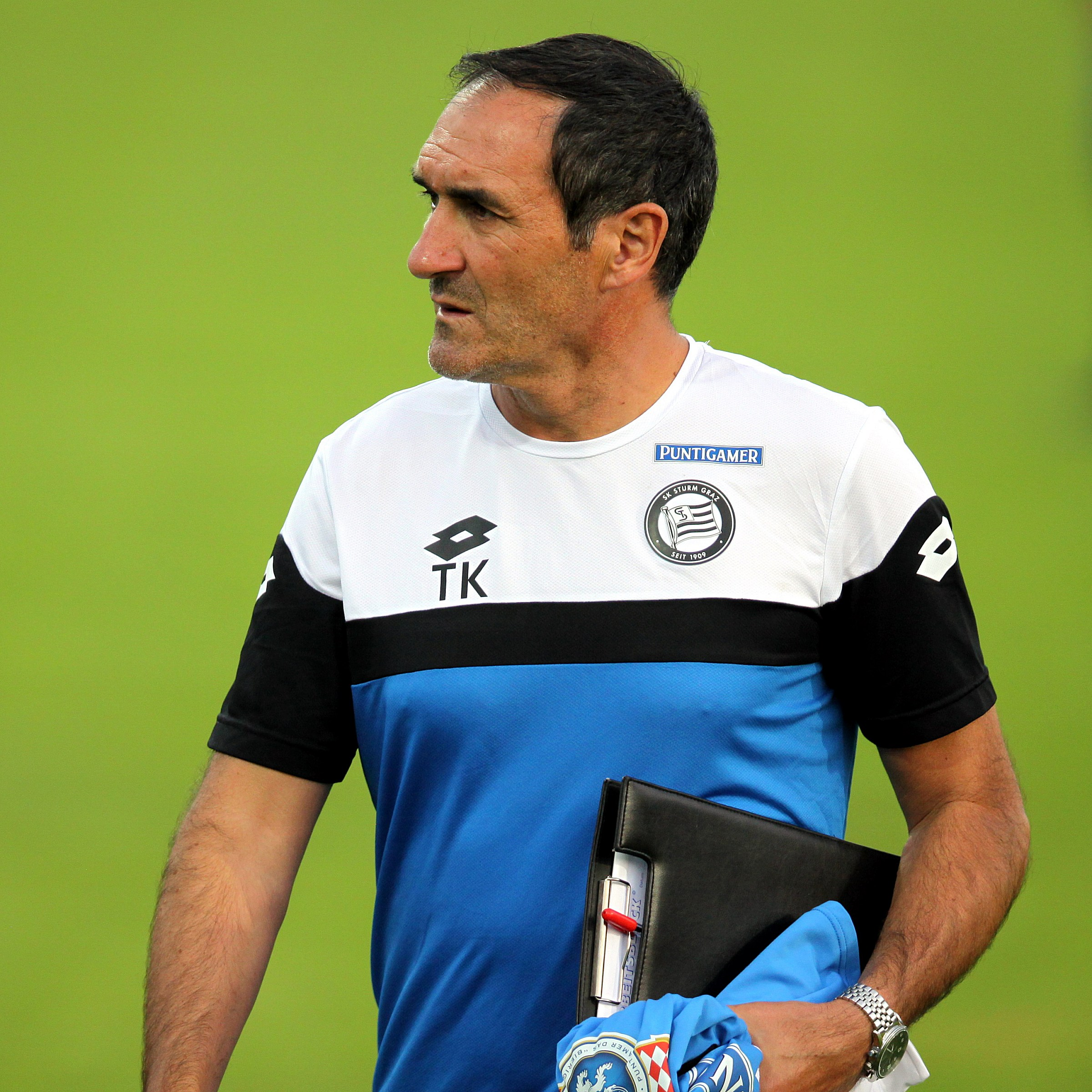
- Kristl in 2015

Personal information
- Date of birth: 18 April 1963 (age 63)
- Place of birth: Regensburg, West Germany
- Height: 1.87 m (6 ft 1 1/2 in)
- Position: Midfielder

Team information
- Current team: Kosovo (assistant)

Youth career
- TuS Pfakofen
- –1982: SV Obertraubling
- 1982–1987: Jahn Regensburg
- 1987–1988: Türkgücü München

Senior career*
Years	Team	Apps	(Gls)
1988–1990	1. FC Nürnberg	41	(7)
1990–1993	1. FC Saarbrücken	44	(9)
1990–1994	1. FC Nürnberg	2	(0)
Total		87	(16)

Managerial career
- 1997–2005: 1. FC Schnaittach
- 2006: Hannover 96 (assistant)
- 2007: 1. FC Amberg
- 2008: 1. FC Amberg
- 2008: Jahn Regensburg
- 2009–2012: Sturm Graz (assistant)
- 2012: Sturm Graz (caretaker)
- 2012–2013: 1. FC Kaiserslautern (assistant)
- 2014–2020: Sturm Graz (assistant)
- 2024–: Kosovo (assistant)
- * Club domestic league appearances and goals

Thomas Kristl (born 18 April 1963) is a German football manager and former player who is the assistant manager of Kosovo national team.

== Career ==
His first senior football club was 1. FC Nürnberg. In 1990, he went to 1. FC Saarbrücken but in 1994 he went back to 1. FC Nürnberg, where he ended his career one year later after 71 appearances in the Bundesliga.

His first club where he was coach was 1. FC Schnaittach. He worked there from 1997 to 2005. In the seasons 2005–06 and 2006–07 he was assistant-coach at Hannover 96.

After two terms at 1. FC Amberg (2006–07 and 2008) he went 2008 to SSV Jahn Regensburg in the 3. Liga (the third highest league in Germany) where he was fired on 24 November 2008. and signed on 11 July 2009 a contract as assistant of Franco Foda by SK Sturm Graz. On 12 April 2012, after the sacking of Franco Foda, Kristl was named as caretaker manager of SK Sturm Graz.
