= BCF Wolfratshausen =

German football club

- Full name: Ball-Club Farchet Wolfratshausen e.V.
- Founded: 1957
- Ground: Isar-Loisach-Stadion
- Capacity: 5,000
- Chairman: Willi Müller
- Manager: Tom Sitter
- League: Bayernliga Süd (V)
- 2015–16: 13th
Home colours	Away colours

The BCF Wolfratshausen is a German association football club from the city of Wolfratshausen, Bavaria.

== History ==
The club was formed in 1957 as BC Farchet, named after a suburb of Wolfratshausen. The club was not a football club as such in its origins but rather its activities took part in the local pub. The term ball in the club names referees to a green ball every club member had to carry as a form of identification. The number of balls was set at 30, making the club quite limited in membership; its current membership sits at 1,400. Failure to produce the ball to another club member on request was a punishable offence. The club was, in those days, what Bavarians referee to as Stöpsel-Club (English: Bottle top club).

The club's lack of football activity was due to not having a home ground at it was decided to play as a reserve team for local side TSV Wolfratshausen to compensate for this. In 1961, the club finally registered with the Bavarian football association and entered competition under its own name. The club's most prominent member in those early days was a young Edmund Stoiber, later to become Minister President of Bavaria. In 1966, the club begun building its own home ground and in 1974, it changed its name to the current BCF Wolfratshausen.

On the field, BCF had to wait considerable time to experience success. In 1995, it came second the local C-Klasse, the lowest possible league a club could play in then in Bavaria, the tenth tier of the Bavarian football league system. After a successful promotion decider, the club moved up a level, to the B-Klasse. In its first season there, it came second but this time failed in the promotion round; a year later it made up for it by winning the league.

The A-Klasse became just another stepping stone for the team, winning the league and earning promotion to the Bezirksliga Oberbayern-Süd. The team came second in this league in its first year there too, but failed in the promotion round, losing in extra time to Wacker Burghausen II. After an average 1999–2000 season, it won its league the year after and moved up to the Bezirksoberliga Oberbayern. In this league, the club proved to good as well, winning it and making it into the tier-five Landesliga Bayern-Süd.

In the Landesliga, BCF looked like repeating the previous seasons, leading the league at the winter break. In spring, it fell somewhat behind and finished the year in fifth place. The next season, 2003–04, it came second in the league after losing a decider to MTV Ingolstadt and had to enter the promotion round. In this game, the team beat SG Quelle Fürth 3–2 and earned promotion to the Oberliga Bayern, Bavarias highest league.

The tier-four Bayernliga provided a mark to high for the club and it finished last in the league, with only six wins out of 34 games, having to return to the Landesliga.

At the end of the 2011–12 season, after a number of seasons in the Landesliga, the club qualified directly for the newly expanded Bayernliga after finishing sixth in the Landesliga. The team struggled against relegation in both the 2012–13 and 2013–14 season, in the later only surviving through victories in the relegation round.

== Honours ==
The club's honours:

=== League ===
- Landesliga Bayern-Süd (V)
  - Runners-up: 2004
- Bezirksoberliga Oberbayern (VI)
  - Champions: 2002
- Bezirksliga Oberbayern-Süd (VII)
  - Champions: 2001
  - Runners-up: 1999
- A-Klasse (VII)
  - Champions: 1999
- B-Klasse (IX)
  - Champions: 1998

=== Recent seasons ===
The recent season-by-season performance of the club:

Season	Division	Tier	Position
1999–2000	Bezirksliga Oberbayern-Süd	VII	9th
2000–01	Bezirksliga Oberbayern-Süd	VII	1st ↑
2001–02	Bezirksoberliga Oberbayern	VI	1st ↑
2002–03	Landesliga Bayern-Süd	V	5th
2003–04	Landesliga Bayern-Süd	V	2nd ↑
2004–05	Bayernliga	IV	18th ↓
2005–06	Landesliga Bayern-Süd	V	4th
2006–07	Landesliga Bayern-Süd	V	13th
2007–08	Landesliga Bayern-Süd	V	7th
2008–09	Landesliga Bayern-Süd	VI	8th
2009–10	Landesliga Bayern-Süd	VI	8th
2010–11	Landesliga Bayern-Süd	VI	10th
2011–12	Landesliga Bayern-Süd	VI	7th ↑
2012–13	Bayernliga Süd	V	13th
2013–14	Bayernliga Süd	V	16th
2014–15	Bayernliga Süd	V	7th
2015–16	Bayernliga Süd	V	13th
2016–17	Bayernliga Süd	V	14th
2017–18	Bayernliga Süd	V	17th ↓

- With the introduction of the Bezirksoberligas in 1988 as the new fifth tier, below the Landesligas, all leagues below dropped one tier. With the introduction of the Regionalligas in 1994 and the 3. Liga in 2008 as the new third tier, below the 2. Bundesliga, all leagues below dropped one tier. With the establishment of the Regionalliga Bayern as the new fourth tier in Bavaria in 2012 the Bayernliga was split into a northern and a southern division, the number of Landesligas expanded from three to five and the Bezirksoberligas abolished. All leagues from the Bezirksligas onward were elevated one tier.

↑ Promoted	↓ Relegated
