= SV Lohhof =

German football club

- Full name: Sportverein Lohhof e.V.
- Founded: 1930
- Ground: Hans-Bayer-Stadion
- Capacity: 8,000
- League: Bezirksliga Oberbayern-Nord (VII)
- 2015–16: 10th
Home colours	Away colours

SV Lohhof is a German association football club from the Lohhof district of Unterschleißheim, Bavaria, north of Munich. The footballers are part of a sports club that includes departments for athletics, badminton, gymnastics, martial arts, swimming, table tennis, tennis, volleyball, as well as fitness and rehabilitation programs.

== History ==
Established sometime in 1930 as Sportverein Lohhof, the football team first came to notice in the early 1990s with an advance to the Bayernliga. After four seasons in tier IV play, SV won its way to the Regionalliga Süd (III) after a second-place finish and successful promotion playoff in 1994. They took part in group play for the national amateur championship, but were quickly eliminated. An unsuccessful Regionalliga campaign followed and the team was sent back down. In 1999, Lohhof took the Bayernliga (IV) championship to return to third division play for the 1999–2000 season.

The club then suffered through disastrous string of reverses; they finished last in the Regionalliga in 1999–2000, 18th of 20 in the Bayernliga in 2000–01, and last in the Landesliga Bayern-Süd (V) in 2001–02. Their slide continued downward through the Bezirksoberliga Oberbayern (VI) and then withdrawing to the Kreisklasse München-3 (IX) in 2003. They won the division title there in 2006 to advance to the Kreisliga Oberbayern, München-1 (VIII) where they finished 12th in 2007–08 and only through a 4–2 win in the final relegation match did the SVL archive to stay in the Kreisliga for another season. The club's result in the league improved after that to the point where it won the Kreisliga in 2013 and earned promotion to the Bezirksliga.

== Honours ==
The club's honours:

- Bayernliga (III-IV)
  - Champions: 1999
  - Runners-up: 1994
- Landesliga Bayern-Süd (IV)
  - Champions: 1990
- Bezirksliga Oberbayern-Nord
  - Runners-up: (3) 1985, 1986, 1987
- Kreisliga München 1
  - Champions: 2013

=== Volleyball ===
Founded in 1975, the club's men's and women's volleyball sides have enjoyed success at the national level. The women's team was German champions in 1982, 1983, and 1984. They also won the German Cup in each of those seasons, and in 1986.

== Recent seasons ==
The recent season-by-season performance of the club:

Season	Division	Tier	Position
1999–2000	Regionalliga Süd	III	18th ↓
2000–01	Bayernliga	IV	18th ↓
2001–02	Landesliga Bayern-Süd	V	20th ↓
2002–03	Bezirksoberliga Oberbayern	VI	18th ↓
2003–04	Kreisklasse München-3 Birk	IX	7th
2004–05	Kreisklasse München-3 Birk	IX	4th
2005–06	Kreisklasse München-3 Birk	IX	1st ↑
2006–07	Kreisliga München-1 Schmid	VIII	9th
2007–08	Kreisliga München-1 Schmid	VIII	12th
2008–09	Kreisliga München-1 Schmid	IX	4th
2009–10	Kreisliga München-1 Schmid	IX	3rd
2010–11	Kreisliga München-1 Schmid	IX	4th
2011–12	Kreisliga München-1 Schmid	IX	10th
2012–13	Kreisliga München-1 Schmid	VIII	1st ↑
2013–14	Bezirksliga Oberbayern-Nord	VII	9th
2014–15	Bezirksliga Oberbayern-Nord	VII	11th
2015–16	Bezirksliga Oberbayern-Nord	VII	10th
2016–17	Bezirksliga Oberbayern-Nord	VII	

- With the introduction of the Bezirksoberligas in 1988 as the new fifth tier, below the Landesligas, all leagues below dropped one tier. With the introduction of the Regionalligas in 1994 and the 3. Liga in 2008 as the new third tier, below the 2. Bundesliga, all leagues below dropped one tier. With the establishment of the Regionalliga Bayern as the new fourth tier in Bavaria in 2012 the Bayernliga was split into a northern and a southern division, the number of Landesligas expanded from three to five and the Bezirksoberligas abolished. All leagues from the Bezirksligas onwards were elevated one tier.

↑ Promoted	↓ Relegated
