= SV Pullach =

- Full name: Sportverein Pullach im Isartal e.V.
- Nickname: Die Raben (The Ravens)
- Founded: 6 August 1946
- Ground: Sportgelände an der Gistlstraße
- Chairman: Heinz Metz
- Manager: Frank Schmöller
- League: Bayernliga Süd (V)
- 2015–16: 2nd
Home colours	Away colours

The SV Pullach is a German association football club from the town of Pullach, Bavaria.

The club's greatest success came in 2013 when it qualified for the southern division of the Bayernliga, the fifth tier of the German football league system.

== History ==
The club was formed on 6 August 1946 and, for most of its history, has been a non-descript amateur side in local Bavarian football.

SVP won promotion to the tier seven Bezirksliga Oberbayern-Süd in 1994 and played three seasons in this league, struggling against relegation in the first two and winning the league in the third.

The Bezirksliga title took the club up to the Bezirksoberliga Oberbayern where it would play for ten of the next eleven seasons. Its first stint of seven seasons was crowned with two fourth-place finishes but a 16th place in 2004 meant relegation back to the Bezirksliga. It immediately rebounded with another title at this level and, this time, became a stronger side in the Bezirksoberliga. After a third and a fourth place the club won this league in 2008 and earned promotion to the Landesliga Bayern-Süd.

The club finished third in the Landesliga in its first year but declined after this to a point where it came 15th in 2011–12. This would have been a relegation rank in most other seasons but the expansion of the Landesliga from three to five division allowed the team to remain at this level and enter the new Landesliga Bayern-Südost. Pullach became the first ever champion of this league in 2013 and earned another promotion, now to the Bayernliga.

In its first season there the team came fifth in the southern division of the Bayernliga, followed by a runners-up finish the season after. Because of a lack of a suitable Regionalliga stadium the club declined to participate in the promotion round to the Regionalliga Bayern.

== Former players ==
- (Germany) Daniel Leugner

== Honours ==
The club's honours:

- Landesliga Bayern-Südost
  - Champions: 2013
- Bezirksoberliga Oberbayern
  - Champions: 2008
- Bezirksliga Oberbayern-Süd
  - Champions: 1997, 2005

== Recent seasons ==
The recent season-by-season performance of the club:

Season	Division	Tier	Position
1999–2000	Bezirksoberliga Oberbayern	VI	4th
2000–01	Bezirksoberliga Oberbayern	VI	12th
2001–02	Bezirksoberliga Oberbayern	VI	13th
2002–03	Bezirksoberliga Oberbayern	VI	4th
2003–04	Bezirksoberliga Oberbayern	VI	16th ↓
2004–05	Bezirksliga Oberbayern-Süd	VII	1st ↑
2005–06	Bezirksoberliga Oberbayern	VI	3rd
2006–07	Bezirksoberliga Oberbayern	VI	4th
2007–08	Bezirksoberliga Oberbayern	VI	1st ↑
2008–09	Landesliga Bayern-Süd	VI	3rd
2009–10	Landesliga Bayern-Süd	VI	9th
2010–11	Landesliga Bayern-Süd	VI	6th
2011–12	Landesliga Bayern-Süd	VI	15th
2012–13	Landesliga Bayern-Südost	VI	1st ↑
2013–14	Bayernliga Süd	V	5th
2014–15	Bayernliga Süd	V	2nd
2015–16	Bayernliga Süd	V	2nd
2016–17	Bayernliga Süd	V	

- With the introduction of the Bezirksoberligas in 1988 as the new fifth tier, below the Landesligas, all leagues below dropped one tier. With the introduction of the Regionalligas in 1994 and the 3. Liga in 2008 as the new third tier, below the 2. Bundesliga, all leagues below dropped one tier. With the establishment of the Regionalliga Bayern as the new fourth tier in Bavaria in 2012 the Bayernliga was split into a northern and a southern division, the number of Landesligas expanded from three to five and the Bezirksoberligas abolished. All leagues from the Bezirksligas onwards were elevated one tier.

=== Key ===
↑ Promoted	↓ Relegated
