= Goran Skeledžić =

Croatian footballer and manager

Personal information
- Full name: Goran Skeledžić
- Date of birth: 7 October 1969 (age 57)
- Place of birth: SFR Yugoslavia
- Position: Forward

Team information
- Current team: DJK SV Helvetia Bad Homburg-Kirdorf (sports dir.)

Senior career*
Years	Team	Apps	(Gls)
1988–1991	Osijek	19	(0)
1991–1994	Spartak Subotica		
1994–1997	Kickers Offenbach	83	(55)
1998–1999	SV Darmstadt 98		
1999–2000	Dynamo Dresden	7	(0)
2000–2001	KSV Klein-Karben		
2001–2002	TSF Usingen		
- * Club domestic league appearances and goals

Goran Skeledžić (born 7 October 1969) is a Croatian football manager and former player.

== Club career ==
Skeledžić played as forward, he started playing with Croatian side NK Osijek in the Yugoslav First League between 1988 and 1991. Next he moved to Serbian side FK Spartak Subotica and played with them in the First League of FR Yugoslavia. Next he moved to Germany where he played four seasons with Kickers Offenbach between 1994 and 1998. Between 1998 and 2002 he had one-year spells with SV Darmstadt 98, Dynamo Dresden, KSV Klein-Karben and TSF Usingen.

After retiring, Skeledžić became a coach.
