= Buntkicktgut =

Street football

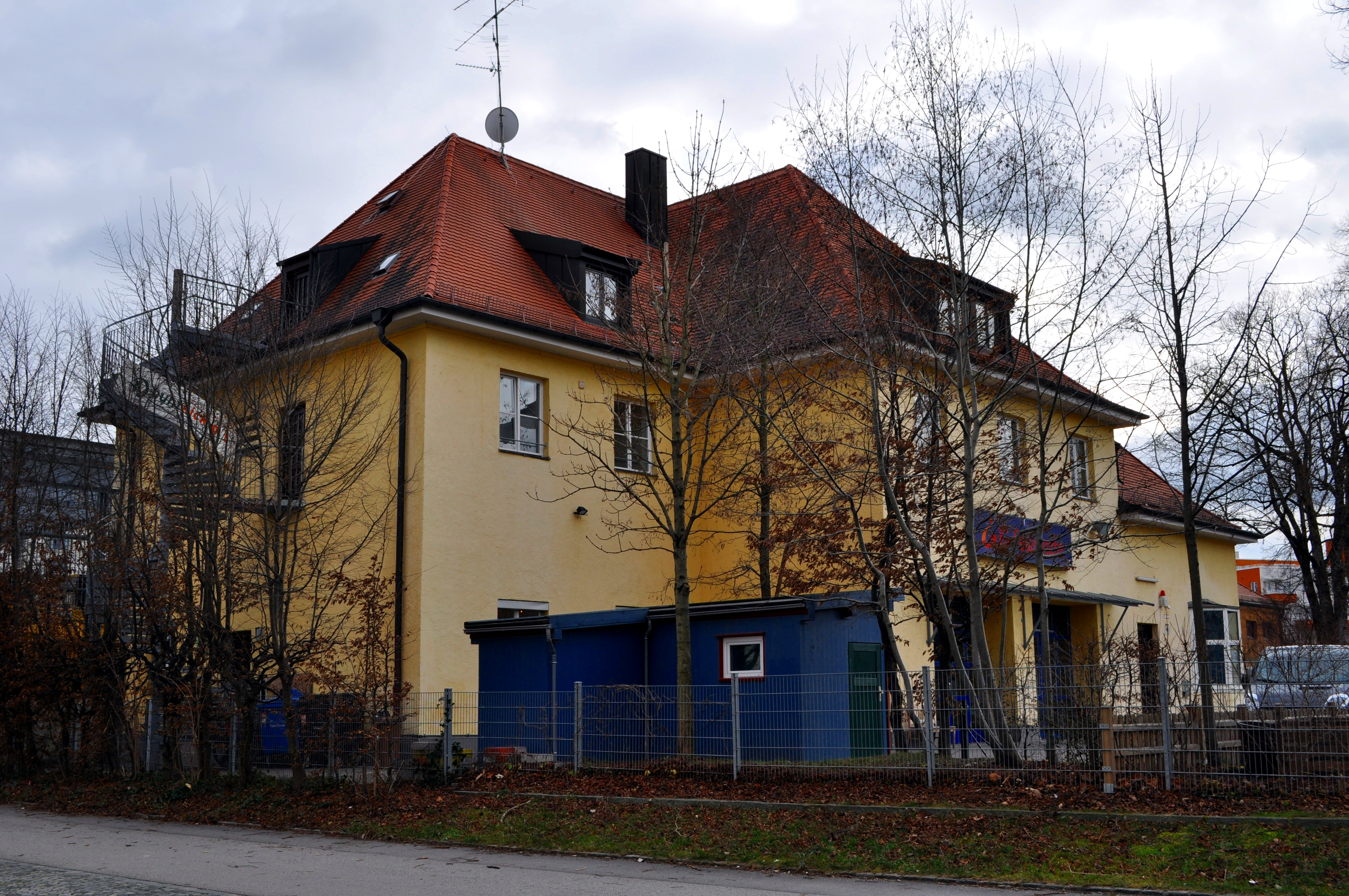
View of Buntkicktgut office on the Theresienhöhe

Buntkicktgut is an intercultural street football league for children and young people. Unique in Europe, the non-profit organization brings children, young people, and adults together from different cultures and social backgrounds in a playful way through its ongoing pioneering work. The approach develops boys and girls all year round, through continuous leagues in several different age groups. With its special form of participation, integration, and identification, Buntkicktgut harnesses the power of street football to enhance the social prospects of the youth based on the promise that football is a common language that it is understood worldwide.

The initiative strives to bring together people from different cultural, social, ethnic, and religious backgrounds, through their involvement not only as participants, but also as organizers and creators. In addition to the location in Munich, there are now street football leagues following the model and accreditation of Buntkicktgut in Dortmund, Berlin, Düsseldorf, Basel, Würzburg, and a multi-city league in Niederbayern.

== Origins ==
Buntkickgut was founded in 1997 as a wave of refugees entered Munich fleeing the Yugoslav Wars. It was an initiative of three social workers engaged in refugee work at the time – the geographer Rüdiger Heid as well as students Memo Arikan and Hans Peter Niessner. With their youth teams “Harras Bulls” and “Weigl Heroes” from two social housing developments laid the foundations for the first league in the U14 age category. Through football, the founders wanted to break down the inter-cultural barriers and language barriers between the young people. The “Refugee League” grew as more and more teams formed and started playing. Since 1998 it has operated under the name of Buntkicktgut.

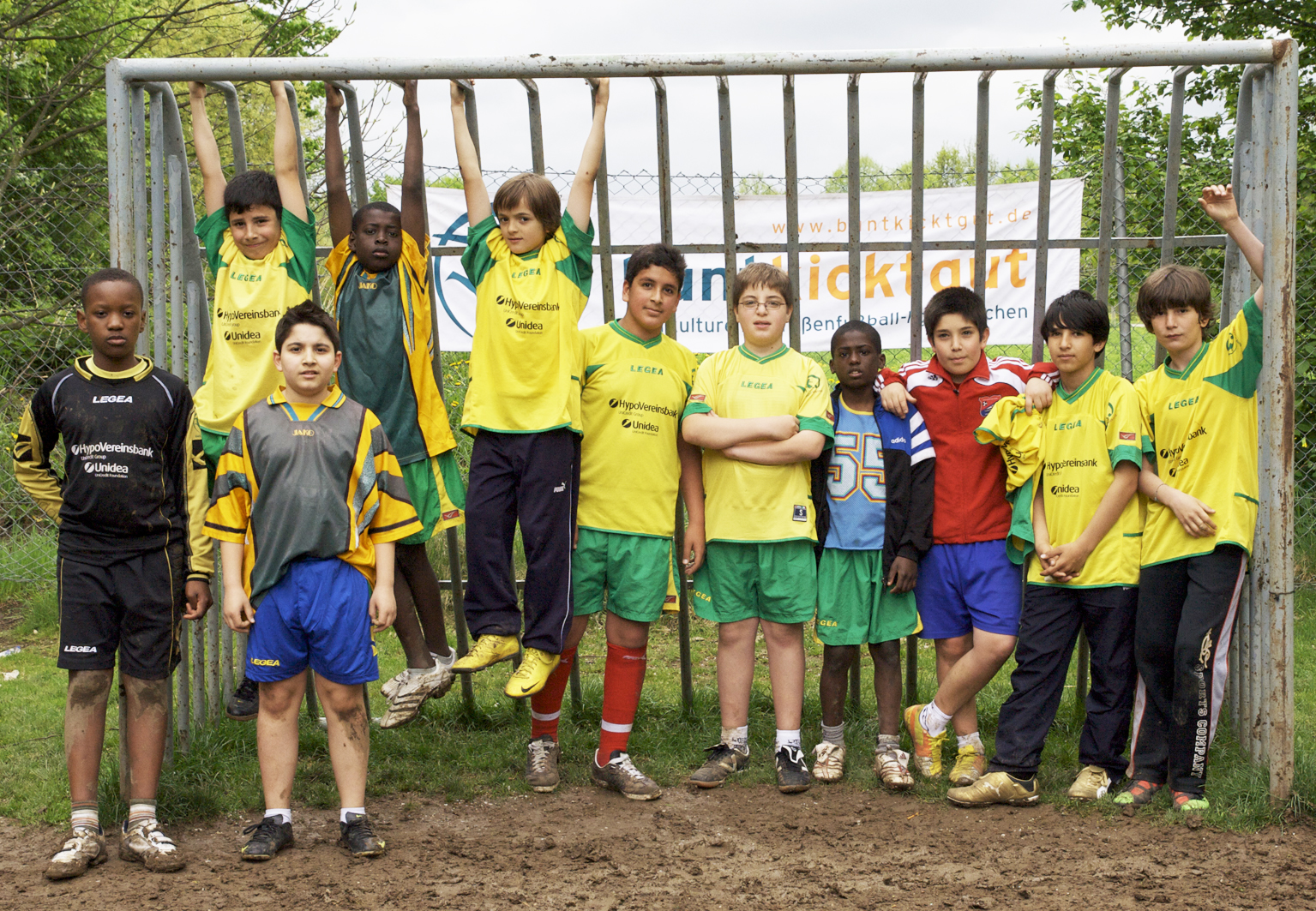
The team “Harras Boys” from Munich – Each year in Munich alone more than 250 teams take part in the street football leagues.

Molded according to the vision of co-founder and director Rüdiger Heid, the project expanded and in Munich alone, it now includes over 2500 participants in over 200 teams from over 100 different countries of origin (correct as of 2015). The most strongly represented countries/regions continue to reflect the origins of the project, as well as former Yugoslavia Bosnia, and Herzegovina, Kosovo, Serbia, Croatia. These include Kurdistan, Afghanistan, Iraq, Iran, Syria, Palestine, Angola, Togo, DR Congo, Nigeria, Tanzania, Ethiopia, Somalia, Sri Lanka and Vietnam. Alongside these, there is an increasing number of participants with migrant backgrounds from EU member states, Turkey, eastern Europe as well as young German people. The leagues (originally supported by the City of Munich Department for Refugees and now by the Initiativgruppe – Interkulturelle Begegnung und Bildung e.V) are firmly established and are being set up in other cities and communities. Through strong cooperation with these institutions, a broad network has been developed with those who provide youth, social and migration work whether independently or on behalf of the community (Kreisjugendring; AWO; Caritas Social Services; Diakonie; Condrobs; Bildungszentren; Kinder- und Mutterschutz e.V.; Verein für Sozialarbeit e.V.)) and involving all relevant government departments (Department for Schooling/Sport; City Youth Department; Streetwork; Department for Health and Environment; Department for Work and Business; Foreign Advisory Council; Regional Committee)

== Objective ==
Through football, children come into contact with other young people from German and foreign backgrounds. Alongside the prevention of youth crime and violence, the objective of the project is to broaden perspectives and to laying educational foundations for young people who grow up in difficult social or economic conditions. As a team sport football acts as a catalyst to break down aggression and frustration, whilst improving social interaction and cooperation. At Buntkicktgut, children learn to accept others regardless of their situation in life or their cultural background. Through a playful and competitive culture, central values are laid down: fairness, tolerance, participation and non-violence. These values are conveyed in particular through the fundamental attitude of the social worker; through recognition of a role model's actions and behavior.

== Leagues ==
The leagues are the central pillar of Buntkicktgut's pedagogical program. Work with children and young people throughout the year is structured around this system. For instance, in the intercultural street football league in the main location of Munich, children and young people between the ages of 7 and 22 play in teams split up into six categories: U11, U13, U15, U17, 17+ and Girls. They play to qualify for the “Champions League” which since April 2006 has run under the motto “Show us your stadium” – with varying locations for matches around the city. Each registered team acts as the host once a season and decides where the match day will take place (e.g. their local recreation ground, school playing fields, park). The match days are organised and coordinated by the Buntkicktgut team and the host team.

The playing year is split up into a summer and a winter league. Matches are played at recreation grounds, playgrounds, parks and sports halls. Girls are eligible to play in all age categories, and there are therefore no restrictions on the number of girls in a team. To cater to the wishes of many female participants, there is also a separate Girls League.

In Munich alone in the 2014 season there were over 200 match days with a total of 2524 matches played on the recreation grounds and parks of Munich. 159 teams took part in the U11, U13, U15, U17, 17+ (Seniors) and Girls (U13-U17) across the whole city. Over the course of the year there were 1091 training sessions, in which around 2500 children and young people took part. Nationwide over 4000 children and young people participated in buntkicktgut, taking part in over 50 training sessions a week and 250 match days per year.

== Participation ==
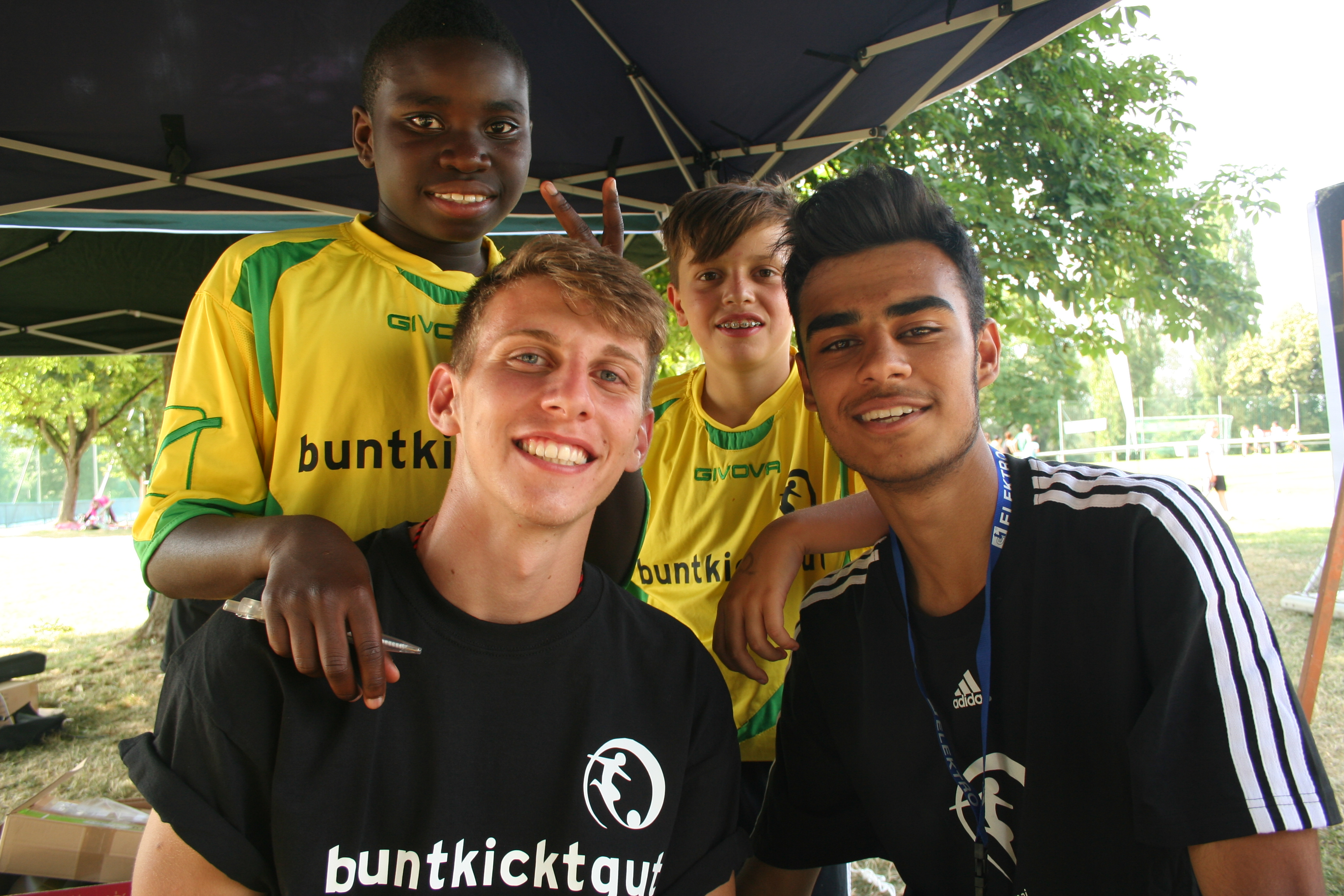
Trained Street Football Workers take over responsibility for younger participants and offer training sessions

The second pillar of the program is the active involvement and participation of young people in key decision making processes. “Buntkicktgut is a street football league for children and young people by children and young people. Along with scoring goals and presence on the pitch, it is about taking responsibility for yourself, your team and the league.”, says Rüdiger Heid. The Buntkicktgut concept of participation consists of six fundamental areas:

=== Street Football Work ===
In districts with points of social conflict, Street Football Workers train individual teams and spread the philosophy of Buntkicktgut: fair play, tolerance, participation and non-violence. Street Football Workers are mostly young people who know the league inside out, play football and have themselves made the leap to overcome difficult social relationships.

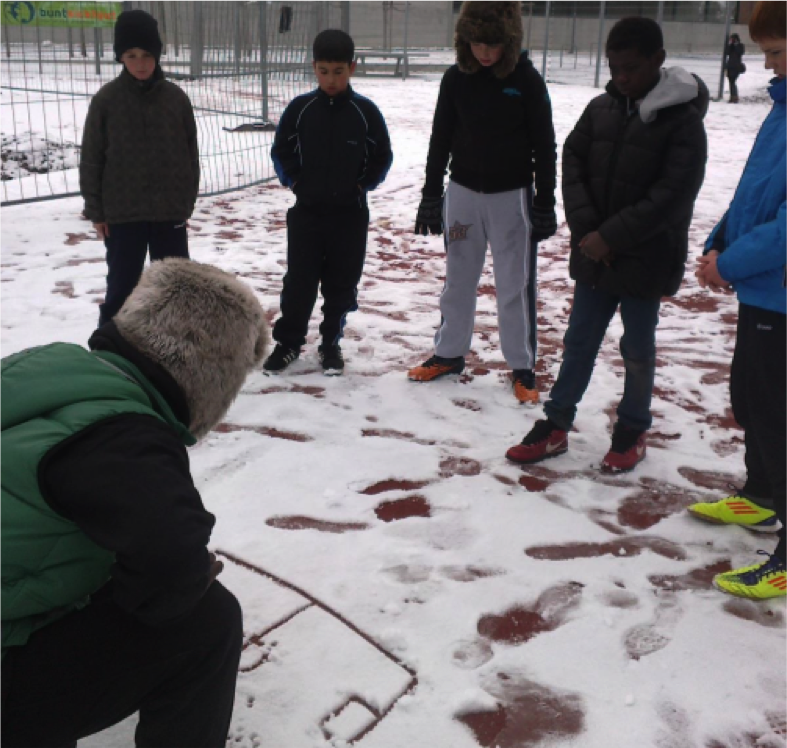
Training sessions run by Street Football Workers take place once a week all year round

With the “Street Football Work” program and the follow-on “School Football Work” program, Buntkicktgut offers open training sessions in recreational grounds and parks based in targeted districts of the city. Street Football Workers are active in their own city district and undertake responsibility for younger participants there. Every Street Football Worker offers regular training sessions at set times (minimum once a week) for groups/teams of 8-12 children or young people on their “home pitch”, be it the school playground, the rec around the corner, a patch of grass in the park or the courtyard of their block of flats. The training session is open to everyone. The teams take part in the city leagues, which span all city districts and run all year round in the form of a summer and a winter season. On top of that there are regular events, camps, and tournaments for special occasions. An important component of the project is the unique organisation of the teams and the assumption of responsibility by young people in the different areas of participation. From this independence and responsibility stems a dynamic which keeps the leagues alive and running.

=== League Council ===
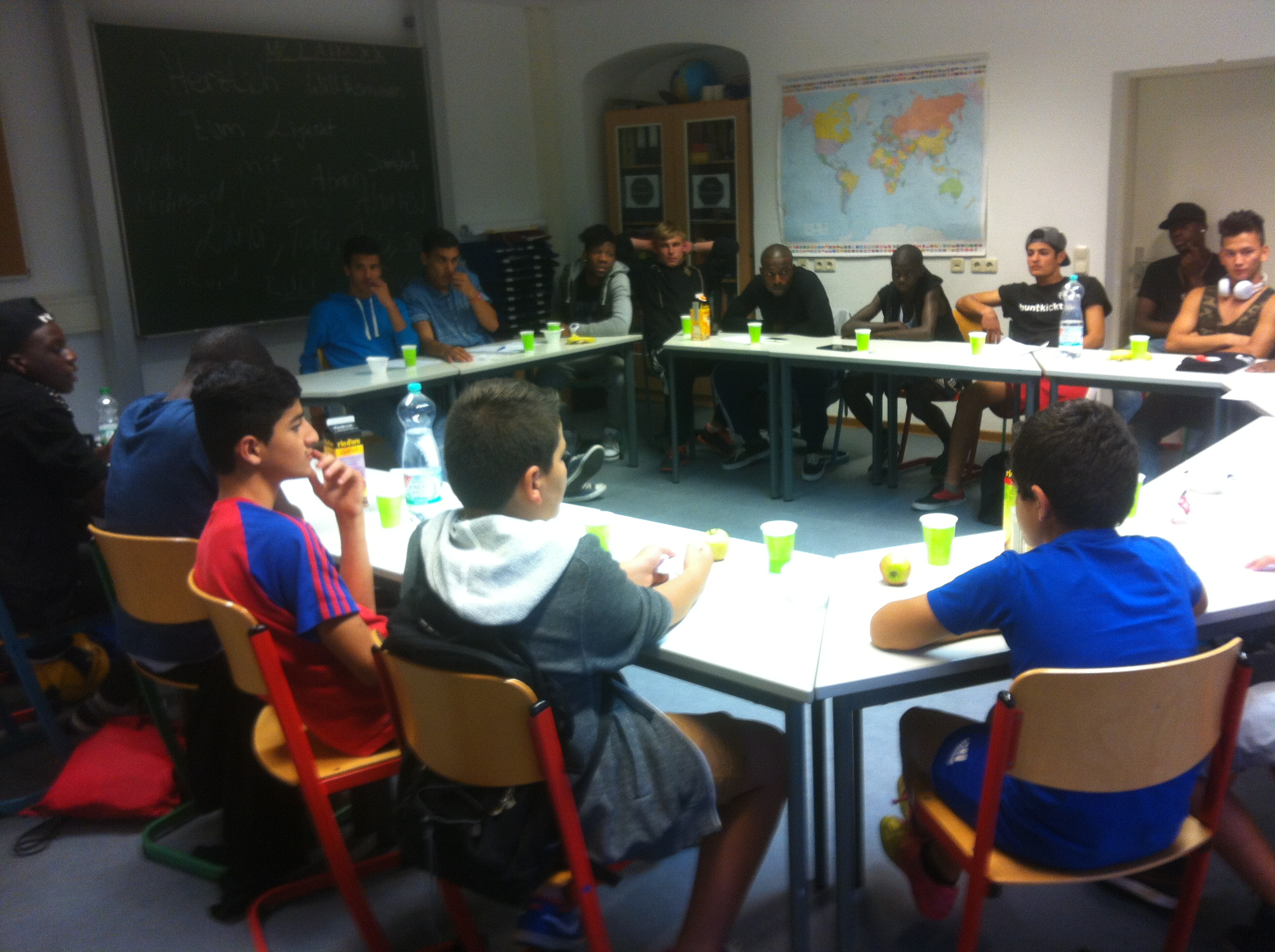
At the Buntkicktgut League Council all problems from the leagues are discussed

The League Council makes rules, monitors compliance with the rules by participants and teams, resolves conflicts, and determines bans or other sanctions. For instance, in Munich, the League Council is composed of the official buntkicktgut referees, who have successfully completed their training. In regular sittings (once or twice a month) they ensure the smooth running of the league and learn to manage responsibility and act conscientiously. The League Council also has the goal of improving identification with others through participation and therefore creating a better understanding of the problems of the different leagues.

=== Buntkicker ===
The street football magazine Buntkicker is published by a youth editorial team in online and print form and serves not only to shape identity and build confidence, but also as an educational tool. It includes match reports, interviews, team and player portraits from the leagues, as well as reports and commentaries on important themes which affect the young people of Buntkicktgut. Joining the editorial team is seen as a creative and educational opportunity for players, allowing them to improve their own and others’ language skills. Those interested gain a first impression of editorial work and thus acquire key skills for the job, utilizing computers, the internet and multimedia technology.

=== Learn-Camps ===
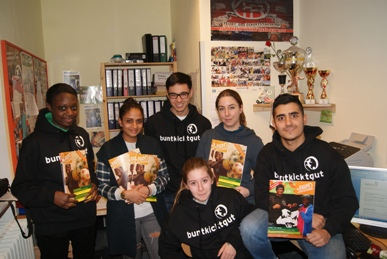
Engagement through editorial work – the editorial team of the street football magazine “Buntkicker”

As well as the continual leagues, Buntkicktgut offers additional holiday programs in cooperation with various partners. For instance the program “Buntkochtgut” is a football nutrition workshop, in which children aged 11 to 13 cook together and thus learn about healthy eating. Additionally, participants learn how they should act in the case of injury and receive intense football training sessions. Alongside paramedics and specialists in nutrition, the Learn Camps are run by Buntkicktgut participants who themselves gain valuable experiences.

A further program that is organised by Buntkicktgut is a language development scheme for primary school children which in particular benefits children from migrant backgrounds. It closes the hole in early language development and moreover bridges the school holidays. The project combines language development and football in a single holistic learning experience. It aims to prevent the early formation of a gap in individuals’ prospects compared to those of their native German counterparts and to improve children's chances of academic and extracurricular success. Of particular note in these Learn Camps is the creation of new partnerships in neighborhoods and the integration of different skills.

=== Referees and officials ===
Participating children and young people can also contribute to Buntkickgut as referees at match days and tournaments. Buntkicktgut's specialist course for referees consists of two classroom-based sessions and culminates in a written exam. In this way, the rules are enforced by young referees instead of adults. The referees have an important function as mediators on and off the pitch. Through this, young people learn how to deal with responsibility, to remain unbiased despite friendships, to put ethnic differences behind them and to referee matches fairly.

=== Representative teams ===
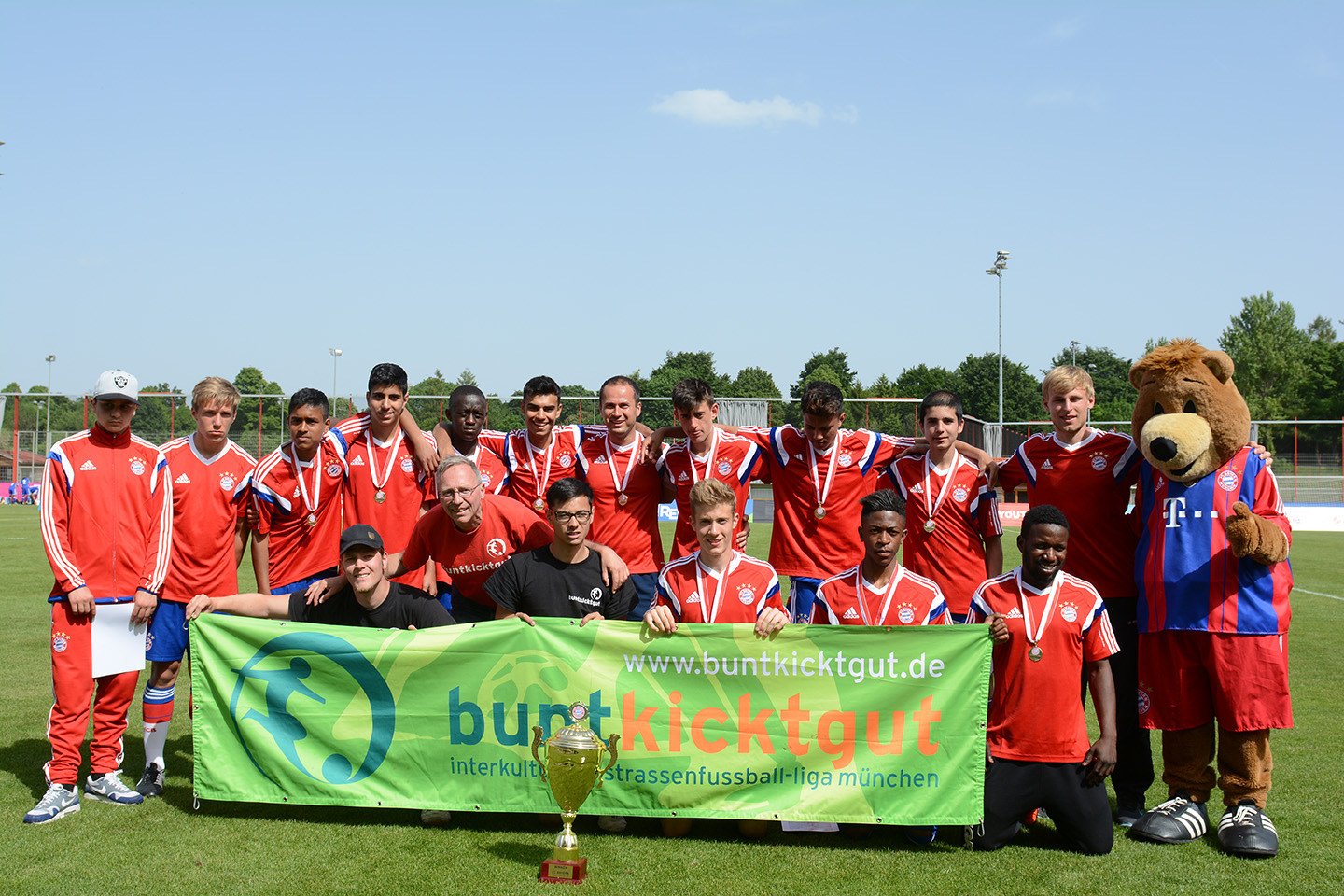
The representative team from Buntkicktgut become world champions as “Team Germany” at the FC Bayern Youth Cup 2014

Special talents and players from Buntkicktgut may play for one of the intercultural street football league's representative teams – e.g. FC Interculturale München. Every Buntkicktgut location has a representative team which competes at events, festivals and international trial tournaments (such as the FC Bayern Youth Cup).

=== ‘Open door’ ethos ===
It is not only the small financial contribution (entry fee from €30 per team) to the street football league that attracts children and young people to Buntkicktgut. The offices in the old fire station in Munich's West Side are a port of call for active players, past and future. No matter what reason brings them there, the doors of the offices are always open to young people. The employees and the participating young people fulfill their organisational tasks and also provide an educational service. The ‘open door’ ethos removes the barrier between coaches and players, and promotes direct interaction with the children. As a result, the young people get to know the daily routine and organisational structure of an ambitious, dynamic social project like Buntkicktgut from both the inside and the outside.

=== Refugee work ===
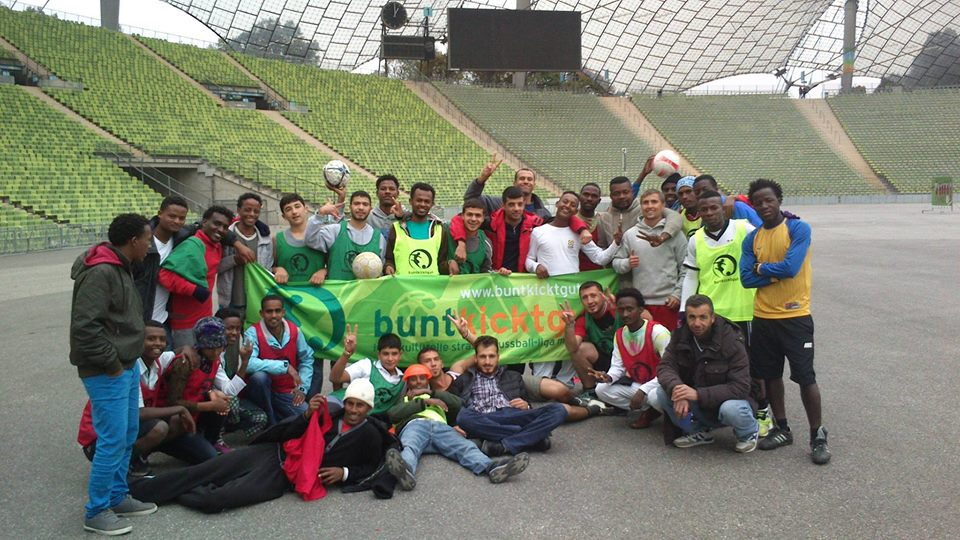
Buntkicktgut offers up to 30 training sessions for refugees in Munich alone. Here is a group from a refugee camp in the Olympic Stadium in Munich

The Buntkicktgut street football workers (SFW) organize and run training sessions for refugees. In and around Munich alone, 30 training sessions are put on weekly involving 400 to 600 refugees, mostly unaccompanied refugee minors (URMs). Also in the Buntkicktgut locations in Berlin, Dortmund, Düsseldorf and Niederbayern (Straubing, Dingolfing and Landshut) the street football workers are experiencing increasing demand for sports programs for young immigrants.

One aim which Buntkicktgut has successfully met for 20 years (see Origins) is to give children and young people a space to play and to develop in the intercultural street football league. It is a place to have fun, offering an escape from the daily grind in refugee camps and their often dramatic tales of flight from their home country. It injects some fun into the players’ day-to-day lives, creates trust and, through the work of the street football workers, builds confidence. The Street Football Workers often have migrant backgrounds themselves, and see eye to eye with the UMFs, having once faced similar difficulties to them.

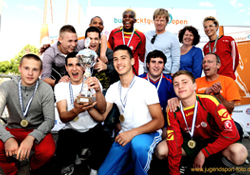
Buntkickgut open 2009 – presentation ceremony with a former German football goalkeeper Oliver Kahn.

== Events ==
=== Tournaments ===
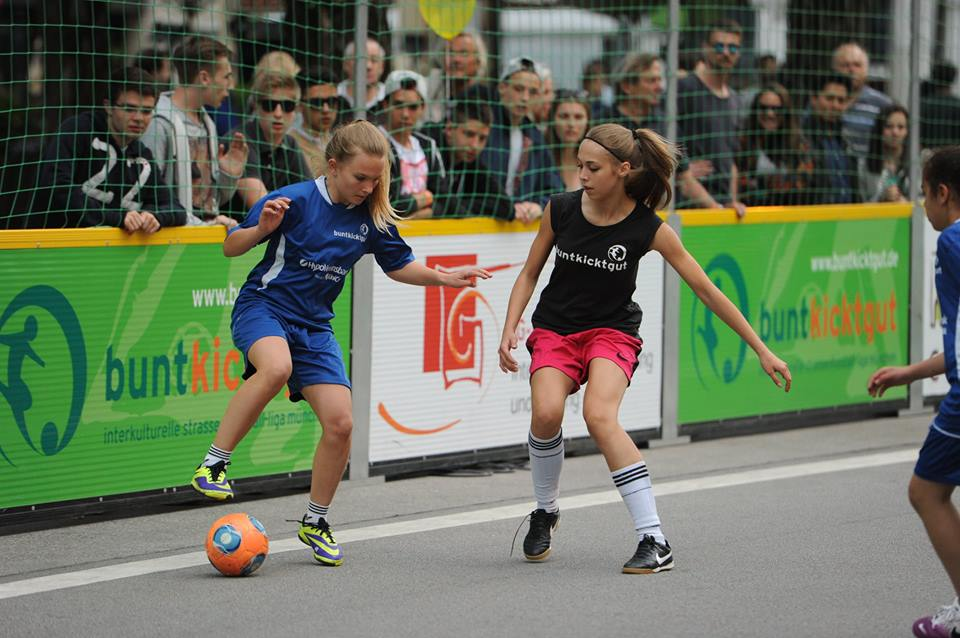
Two participants in the Buntkicktgut-open: UniCredit Cup 2015 on the Leopoldstraße in Munich

Alongside the regular leagues, Buntkicktgut organizes different tournaments every year (called “Buntkicktgut-opens”) which are open to teams from all age groups that don't take part in the regular leagues. Included in these are the UniCredit Cup (Säbener Straße 2009, Olympiapark 2010, Königsplatz 2011, UEFA Champions League Final 2012, Corso Leopold as part of the Streetlife Festival (“Meet the Street”) 2013, Corso Leopold/Streetlife Festival in cooperation with Terre Des Hommes (“Kinder.Straße.Raum.”). In 2013 buntkicktgut held a tournament as part of the 6th Street Football Network Festival 2013. In 2015 the winners of the buntkicktgut-open on the Corso Leopold qualified for the “Road to Berlin”, competing in the Champions Cup in the Ministergärten in Berlin. 2015 also saw the CrossCultureCup, played in front of the Brandenburg Gate during the “Champions Week” in which politicians, celebrities, former players, and the players of buntkicktgut formed individual teams. The organisation of tournaments and standalone events for special occasions like fetes, festivals or remembrance days (e.g. “Day of Public Monuments/European Heritage Days”, Streetlife Festival, City District Weeks, ispo Munich, World Festival of Street football 2006 or the FC Bayern Youth Cup) give players the opportunity to gain experience and mix with children and young people outside the normal leagues. The same is true of the Buntkicktgut referees, who are used nationwide for fetes, festivals, tournaments and the “PlayStation Junior Soccer Cup Series” in 2013, 2014 and 2015.

=== Holiday camps and youth mobilization ===
Camps, outings, trips, and youth exchanges offer the children and young people of Buntkicktgut the opportunity to “look past the end of their own nose”, i.e. to broaden their horizons and to make new contacts. These excursions are also an irreplaceable sphere of learning for identification, team spirit and social responsibility. Examples are the summer camps supported by the EU and local partner initiatives in 2011 (Lepoglava, Croatia), 2012 (Katy Wroclawskie, Poland), 2013 (Subotica, Serbia), 2014 (Szombathely, Hungary), 2015 (Carcassonne, France) and 2016 (Lutherstadt Eisleben, Germany).

=== Sport and development ===
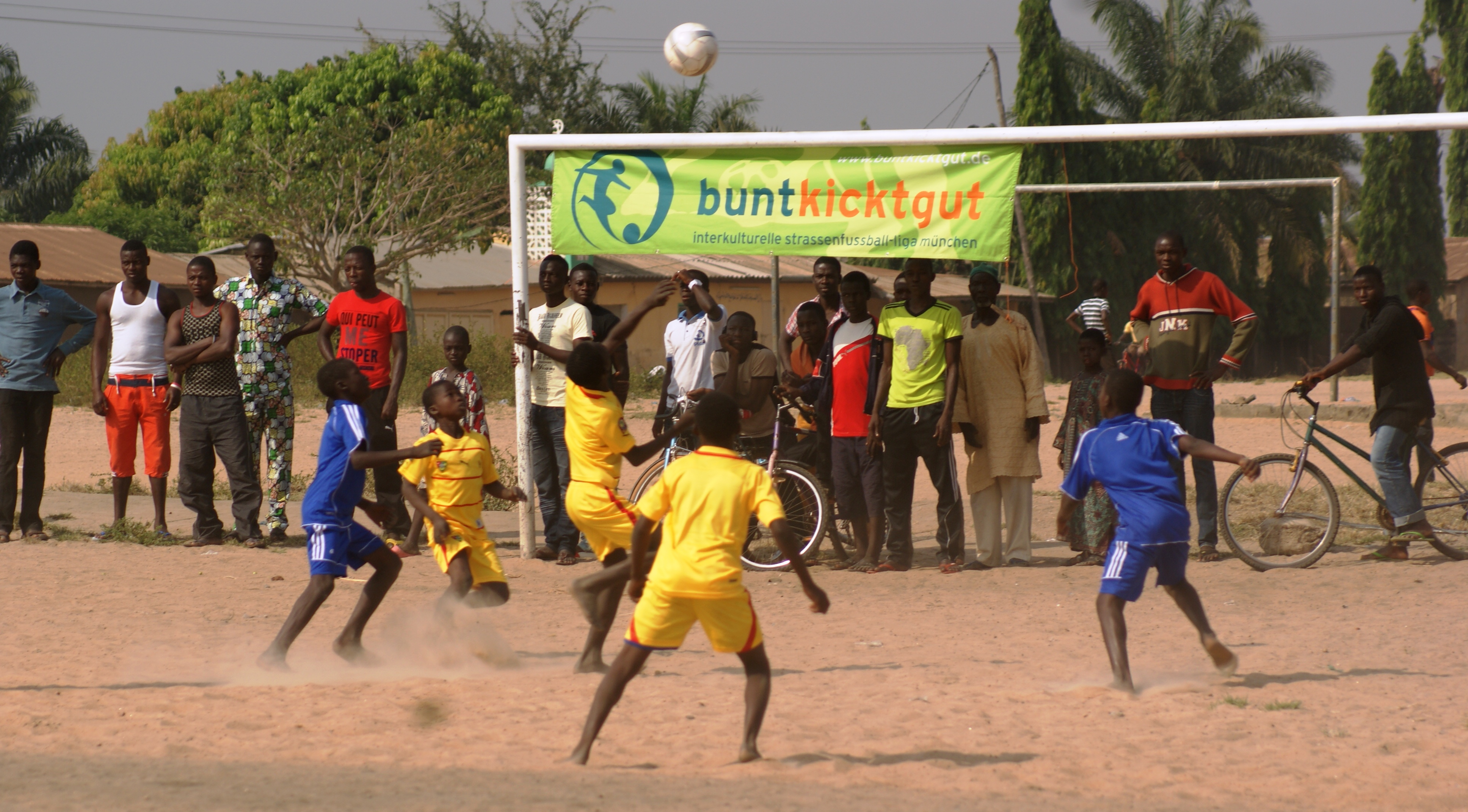
Playing with participants in their homeland – Buntkicktgut at the “Coupe de l’amitié” in Sokodé, Togo

Buntkicktgut supports its players not only in Germany but also in their engagement in and for their homelands. The potential for collaboration with diaspora/migrant organisations with civil society organisations in Germany and in other countries is immense because the young people involved are real and tangible role models here and back home. Since 2010 buntkicktgut has been active in the city of Sokodé in Togo, West Africa. Sokodé is the hometown of long term player turned Buntkicktgut employee Oussman Kofia. Since 2011, he has shown players from Buntkicktgut his hometown once a year as part of the “Festekpé” regional festival of culture and the “Coupe de l’amitié” football tournament. Together with his father Bagna in 2013 he played an important role in founding the “Commission for Sport & Development” in Sokodé. Since 2015 Sokodé has counted as one of the official buntkicktgut locations.

== Results ==
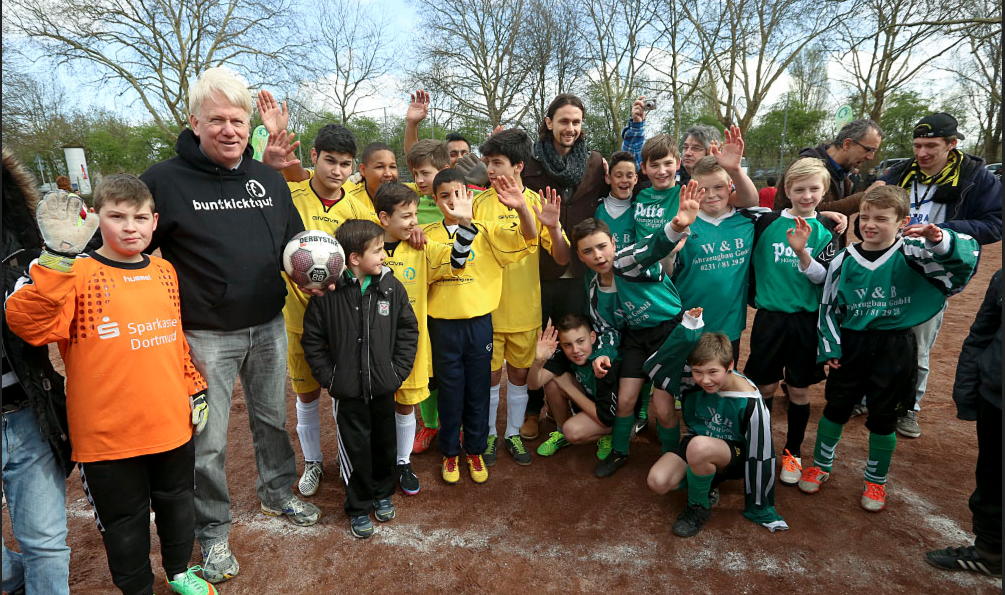
For Buntkicktgut in Dortmund, Neven Subotić is active as patron – here at the season's opener in the Nordstadt district.

According to the Buntkicktgut vision, football is a tool enabling young people to experience success. Through active participation, Buntkickgut's players learn the rules of football, how to be respectful, and how to manage and resolve conflict. Since 1997 over 40 000 children and young people from over 100 countries have taken part. Furthermore, the concept and methods of Buntkicktgut are being copied by other communities, foundations and clubs in other cities and regions. The project stems from the principle that younger children can learn from older children. Older children are trained and then put in a position of responsibility for the younger children. The leagues offer a place where conflicts are not shut out entirely, but occur in the controlled context of football where there are conflict resolution mechanisms in place, instead of elsewhere in more dangerous places. Street football works not least as an outlet for releasing aggression.

== Recognition and awards ==
In December 2000 Buntkicktgut was distinguished with the “Münchner Lichtblicke” (“Munich Ray of Light”) award from the Lord Major Christian Ude, Lichterkette e.V. and the Munich Foreign Office. In August 2002 the project received the first prize in the Integration Competition 2002 “Putting Words into Action”, awarded by the President Johannes Rau in Bellevue Castle. In 2007 buntkicktgut won the Integration Prize from the German Football Association and Mercedes-Benz. In 2012 the buntkicktgut branch in Dortmund was also awarded the Integration Prize from the German Football Association and Mercedes-Benz. In December 2014 buntkicktgut was singled out by the Federal Agency for Political Education in the competition “Active for Democracy and Tolerance”. In 2015 Dirk Nowitzki awarded buntkicktgut the accreditation of the analysis company PHINEO.

== New locations ==
The multi-award-winning Buntkicktgut blueprint for work with children and young people is being imitated in other communities nationwide according to the model of the Munich project. Above all, the education of Street Football Workers will be centrally coordinated across the network. Currently buntkicktgut is active in Munich, Düsseldorf and Dortmund, Berlin-Neukölln, Berlin-Kreuzberg, Basel, Würzburg, and Niederbayern (Straubing, Dingolfing, Landshut u.a.).

== Patronage ==
Oliver Kahn was active as patron for Buntkicktgut from 2005 to 2010. Currently, Bayern Munich player Jérôme Boateng is engaged in the whole Buntkicktgut project. The patron of Buntkicktgut Dortmund is Borussia Dortmund player Neven Subotic. In Berlin Dilek Kolat, the Senator for Work, Integration and Women, acts as patron for buntkicktgut. On top of this, the Neukölln Major Dr. Franziska Giffey, the Councillor Jan-Christoph Rämer (City Council for Education, Schools, Culture and Sport in Neukölln) and Councillor Falko Liecke (City Council for Youth and Health) are patrons for the street football league in Neukölln.
