= Slaven Skeledžić =

German football manager (born 1971)

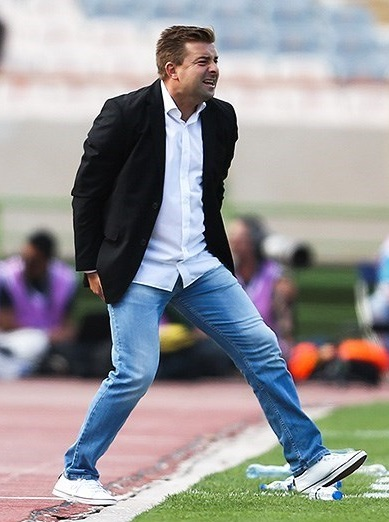
- Skeledžić coaching Afghanistan in 2018 FIFA World Cup qualification against Japan

Personal information
- Date of birth: 15 November 1971 (age 54)
- Place of birth: Vareš, SFR Yugoslavia

Managerial career
- Years: Team
- 2006–2011: Eintracht Frankfurt (youth)
- 2011–2012: Hansa Rostock (youth)
- 2012–2014: Hannover 96 (youth)
- 2014–2015: FSV Frankfurt (youth)
- 2015: Afghanistan
- 2016–2017: Guangzhou Evergrande (Head of Academy)
- 2018–2022: Bayern Munich U17 (assistant)
- 2022–2023: Rheindorf Altach (assistant)
- 2025: Türkgücü München

Slaven Skeledžić (born 15 November 1971) is a German football manager.

== Managerial career ==
Skeledžić coached many youth clubs in Germany, including youth clubs of Bundesliga teams and second-tier teams in Germany. On 9 February 2015, he signed a contract with the Afghanistan Football Federation to coach their national team. With his experience and skills he wanted to bring the European style of play to Afghanistan. He was fired as coach of the national team after many defeats.

On 1 July 2018, Skeledžić was hired as the assistant manager to Miroslav Klose at Bayern Munich U17 team. In June 2022, both were appointed as staff for Austrian club SC Rheindorf Altach.

On 11 June 2025, Skeledžić was appointed head coach of recently relegated Bayernliga side Türkgücü München. He resigned after only four defeats in as many matches, later citing organisational turmoil at the club. In a subsequent interview he stated that Türkgücü suffered from "massive structural deficiencies" and that "working professionally in this environment was nowhere near possible".

== Personal life ==
Born in Bosnia, Skeledžić left his country at the age of 4 with his parents to build a future in Germany. He currently lives in Bad Homburg.
