= 2011–12 SpVgg Greuther Fürth season =

SpVgg Greuther Fürth
2011–12 season
- 2. Bundesliga: 1st (promoted)
- DFB-Pokal: Quarter-final
Home colours	Away colours	Third colours

The 2011–12 SpVgg Greuther Fürth season started on 15 July against Eintracht Frankfurt in the 2. Bundesliga.

Greuther Fürth finished first in the league table and won promotion.

== Results ==
=== Legend ===
Win Draw Loss

=== 2. Bundesliga ===
15 July 2011 1	SpVgg Greuther Fürth	2–3	Eintracht Frankfurt	Fürth
20:30 CEST	Nöthe 20', 44'	Match Report	Meier 56', 64'; Matmour 89'	Stadium: Trolli Arena; Attendance: 14,200 (sell-out); Referee: Manuel Gräfe; Man of the Match: Meier

23 July 2011 2	1. FC Union Berlin	0–4	SpVgg Greuther Fürth	Berlin
15:30 CEST		Match Report	Schmidtgal 8'; Occean 26', 50'; Nehrig 80' (pen.)	Stadium: Stadion An der Alten Försterei; Attendance: 15,004; Referee: Guido Winkmann; Man of the Match: Occean

6 August 2011 3	SpVgg Greuther Fürth	1–0	Dynamo Dresden	Fürth
13:00 CEST	Occean 48'	Match Report		Stadium: Trolli Arena; Attendance: 11,340; Referee: Tobias Stieler; Man of the Match: Occean

13 August 2011 4	SC Paderborn 07	0–1	SpVgg Greuther Fürth	Paderborn
13:00 CEST		Match Report	Nöthe 59'	Stadium: Energieteam Arena; Attendance: 6,147; Referee: Norbert Grudzinski; Man of the Match: Nöthe

19 August 2011 5	SpVgg Greuther Fürth	3–0	FC Ingolstadt 04	Fürth
18:00 CEST	Occean 9'; Nöthe 53'; Klaus 74'	Match Report		Stadium: Trolli Arena; Attendance: 8,270; Referee: Christian Fischer; Man of the Match: Fürstner

26 August 2011 6	VfL Bochum	1–4	SpVgg Greuther Fürth	Paderborn
16:00 CEST	Freier 41'	Match Report	Sararer 35', 68'; Occean 52'; Nöthe 60'	Stadium: Energieteam Arena; Attendance: 10,719; Referee: Tobias Welz; Man of the Match: Sararer

9 September 2011 7	SpVgg Greuther Fürth	2–1	MSV Duisburg	Fürth
18:00 CEST	Fürstner 58'; Nöthe 64'	Match Report	Gjasula 66'	Stadium: Trolli Arena; Attendance: 9,030; Referee: Bibiana Steinhaus; Man of the Match: Fürstner

18 September 2011 8	Alemannia Aachen	0–0	SpVgg Greuther Fürth	Aachen
13:30 CEST		Match Report		Stadium: New Tivoli; Attendance: 14,867; Referee: Tobias Stieler; Man of the Match: Grün

25 September 2011 9	SpVgg Greuther Fürth	2–0	TSV 1860 Munich	Fürth
13:30 CEST	Nöthe 27'; Nehrig 54'	Match Report		Stadium: Trolli Arena; Attendance: 9,030; Referee: Christian Bandurski; Man of the Match: Nehrig

2 October 2011 10	Karlsruher SC	2–2	SpVgg Greuther Fürth	Karlsruhe
13:30 CEST	Krebs 69'; Aquaro 85'	Match Report	Schmidtgal 19'; Mavraj 90+2'	Stadium: Wildparkstadion; Attendance: 13,245; Referee: Tobias Stieler; Man of the Match: Buckley

16 October 2011 11	SpVgg Greuther Fürth	2–0	Erzgebirge Aue	Fürth
13:30 CEST	Peković 41'; Sararer 58'	Match Report		Stadium: Trolli Arena; Attendance: 10,560; Referee: Florian Steuer; Man of the Match: Grün

22 October 2011 12	FC Energie Cottbus	0–2	SpVgg Greuther Fürth	Cottbus
13:00 CEST		Match Report	Occean 21'; Sararer 73'	Stadium: Stadion der Freundschaft; Attendance: 9,910; Referee: Florian Meyer; Man of the Match: Occean

31 October 2011 13	SpVgg Greuther Fürth	1–3	Eintracht Braunschweig	Fürth
20:15 CET	Occean 83'	Match Report	Kumbela 25'; Kruppke 52'; Vrančić 85'	Stadium: Trolli Arena; Attendance: 10,240; Referee: Felix Zwayer; Man of the Match: Kumbela

5 November 2011 14	FC St. Pauli	2–2	SpVgg Greuther Fürth	Hamburg
13:00 CET	Daube 54'; Sağlık 75'	Match Report	Nöthe 44'; Occean 90'	Stadium: Millerntor-Stadion; Attendance: 24,487 (sell-out); Referee: Thorsten Kinhöfer; Man of the Match: Daube

20 November 2011 15	SpVgg Greuther Fürth	4–0	FSV Frankfurt	Fürth
13:30 CET	Schröck 41'; Nehrig 48' (pen.); Prib 58'; Occean 72'	Match Report		Stadium: Trolli Arena; Attendance: 7,030; Referee: Tobias Christ; Man of the Match: Sararer

28 November 2011 16	Fortuna Düsseldorf	2–1	SpVgg Greuther Fürth	Düsseldorf
13:00 CET	Fink 18'; Langeneke 39' (pen.)	Match Report	Prib 63'	Stadium: Esprit Arena; Attendance: 33,017; Referee: Peter Gagelmann; Man of the Match: Lukimya

3 December 2011 17	SpVgg Greuther Fürth	3–0	Hansa Rostock	Fürth
13:00 CET	Occean 11'; Schröck 58'; Sararer 75'	Match Report		Stadium: Trolli Arena; Attendance: 7,480; Referee: Robert Kempter; Man of the Match: Schröck

12 December 2011 18	Eintracht Frankfurt	0–0	SpVgg Greuther Fürth	Frankfurt
20:15 CET		Match Report		Stadium: Commerzbank-Arena; Attendance: 35,500; Referee: Thorsten Kinhöfer; Man of the Match: Schmidtgal

16 December 2011 19	SpVgg Greuther Fürth	5–0	1. FC Union Berlin	Fürth
18:00 CET	Nöthe 2', 23'; Madouni 10' (o.g.); Schröck 64'; Nehrig 71'	Match Report		Stadium: Trolli Arena; Attendance: 7,130; Referee: Christian Dingert; Man of the Match: Schröck

3 February 2012 20	Dynamo Dresden	3–1	SpVgg Greuther Fürth	Dresden
18:00 CET	Koch 5'; Poté 53'; Dedić 73'	Report	Serarer 63'	Stadium: Rudolf-Harbig-Stadion; Attendance: 23,555; Referee: Tobias Welz; Man of the Match: Koch

12 February 2012 21	SpVgg Greuther Fürth	5–1	SC Paderborn 07	Fürth
13:30 CET	Asamoah 6', 45+2'; Sararer 11'; Occean 47'; Mavraj 57'	Report	Proschwitz 5'	Stadium: Trolli Arena; Attendance: 9,230; Referee: Knut Kircher; Man of the Match: Sararer

19 February 2012 22	FC Ingolstadt 04	0–0	SpVgg Greuther Fürth	Ingolstadt
13:30		Report		Stadium: Audi Sportpark; Attendance: 7,010; Referee: Bibiana Steinhaus; Man of the Match: Matip

23	SpVgg Greuther Fürth	6–2	VfL Bochum	Fürth
				Stadium: Trolli Arena

24	MSV Duisburg	v	SpVgg Greuther Fürth	Duisburg
				Stadium: Schauinsland-Reisen-Arena

25	SpVgg Greuther Fürth	v	Alemannia Aachen	Fürth
				Stadium: Trolli Arena

26	TSV 1860 Munich	v	SpVgg Greuther Fürth	Munich
				Stadium: Allianz Arena

27	SpVgg Greuther Fürth	v	Karlsruher SC	Fürth
				Stadium: Trolli Arena

28	Erzgebirge Aue	v	SpVgg Greuther Fürth	Aue
				Stadium: Sparkassen-Erzgebirgsstadion

29	SpVgg Greuther Fürth	v	FC Energie Cottbus	Fürth
				Stadium: Trolli Arena

30	Eintracht Braunschweig	v	SpVgg Greuther Fürth	Braunschweig
				Stadium: Eintracht-Stadion

31	SpVgg Greuther Fürth	v	FC St. Pauli	Fürth
				Stadium: Trolli Arena

32	FSV Frankfurt	v	SpVgg Greuther Fürth	Frankfurt
				Stadium: Frankfurter Volksbank Stadion

29 April 2012 33	SpVgg Greuther Fürth	v	Fortuna Düsseldorf	Fürth
13:30 CEST				Stadium: Trolli Arena

6 May 2012 34	Hansa Rostock	v	SpVgg Greuther Fürth	Rostock
13:30 CEST				Stadium: DKB-Arena

=== DFB-Pokal ===
31 July 2011 Round 1	Eimsbütteler TV	0–10	SpVgg Greuther Fürth	Hamburg
14:30 CEST		Match Report	Mavraj 17'; Sararer 19', 25', 76', 85'; Tyrała 54', 70'; Nehrig 66' (pen.); Nöthe 80'; Rahn 88'	Stadium: Stadion Hoheluft; Attendance: 2,086; Referee: Thomas Metzen

25 October 2011 Round 2	SpVgg Greuther Fürth	4–0	SC Paderborn 07	Fürth
20:30 CEST	Peković 5'; Nöthe 29'; Occean 35'; Pektürk 79'	Match Report		Stadium: Trolli Arena; Attendance: 6,150; Referee: Markus Schmidt; Man of the Match: Schmidtgal

20 December 2011 Round of 16	1. FC Nürnberg	0–1	SpVgg Greuther Fürth	Nuremberg
19:00 CET		Match Report	Prib 15'	Stadium: easyCredit-Stadion; Attendance: 48,548 (sell-out); Referee: Knut Kircher; Man of the Match: Schmidtgal

8 February 2012 Quarter-final	TSG 1899 Hoffenheim	v	SpVgg Greuther Fürth	Sinsheim
19:00 CET				Stadium: Rhein-Neckar Arena

== Roster and statistics ==
Squad Season 2011–12
Players				2. Bundesliga		DFB-Pokal		Totals	
No.	Players	Nat.	at Fürth since	MP	G	MP	G	MP	G
Goalkeepers
26	Max Grün	German	2009	19	0	3	0	22	0
16	Jasmin Fejzić	Bosnian	2009	0	0	0	0	0	0
24	Franco Flückiger	German	2011	0	0	0	0	0	0
Defenders
27	Fabian Baumgärtel	German	2004	0	0	1	0	1	0
18	Christian Dorda	German	2011	0	0	0	0	0	0
3	Asen Karaslavov	Bulgarian	2007	10	0	1	0	7	0
19	Thomas Kleine	German	2010	19	0	3	0	22	0
4	Kevin Kraus	German	2011	1	0	0	0	1	0
5	Mergim Mavraj	German	2011	17	1	3	1	20	2
15	Christian Rahn	German	2009	3	0	1	0	4	0
17	Stephan Schröck	Filipino	2001	19	3	2	0	21	3
Midfielders
8	Stephan Fürstner	German	2009	14	1	2	0	16	1
30	Johannes Geis	German	2008	2	0	0	0	2	0
36	Felix Klaus	German	2006	9	1	1	0	10	1
7	Bernd Nehrig	German	2007	18	4	3	1	21	5
13	Milorad Peković	Montenegran	2010	15	1	2	1	17	2
34	Tayfun Pektürk	German	2010	14	0	2	1	16	1
14	Edgar Prib	Russian	1996	17	2	3	1	20	3
6	Heinrich Schmidtgal	Kazakhstani	2011	18	2	3	0	21	2
10	Sebastian Tyrała	Polish	2011	4	0	1	2	5	2
21	Robert Zillner	German	2011	1	0	0	0	1	0
Forwards
29	Stefan Kolb	German	2010	0	0	0	0	0	0
9	Christopher Nöthe	German	2009	19	10	3	2	22	12
25	Olivier Occean	Canadian	2011	19	10	3	1	22	11
20	Kingsley Onuegbu	Nigerian	2010	1	0	0	0	1	0
23	Sercan Sararer	Spanish	2000	19	5	3	4	22	9
22	Dani Schahin	German	2011	8	0	1	0	9	0
MP = Matches played — G = Goals scored
Sources: Kicker.de
