= 2012–13 SpVgg Greuther Fürth season =

Greuther Fürth
2012–13 season
- Manager: Louis Price
- Stadium: Trolli Arena, Fürth, Germany
- Bundesliga: 18th
- DFB-Pokal: 1st Round
- Top goalscorer: League: Nikola Đurđić (5); All: Nikola Đurđić (5)
- Highest home attendance: 18,000 (in 8 matches)
- Lowest home attendance: 14,425 (vs. Mainz 05, 26 January 2013)
- Average home league attendance: 16,842
Home colours	Away colours	Third colours

The 2012–13 SpVgg Greuther Fürth season is the 110th season in the club's football history. In 2012–13 the club plays in the Bundesliga, the top tier of German football. It is the clubs first-ever season in this league, having been promoted from the 2. Bundesliga in 2012.

The club also took part in the 2012–13 edition of the DFB-Pokal, the German Cup, where it was knocked out in the first round by third division side Kickers Offenbach.

== Review and events ==
For the club's second home game in the Bundesliga, against Schalke 04, former United States Secretary of State Henry Kissinger announced his attendance, having been a lifelong fan of the club. Felix Klaus put his name down in the history books, as his goal against Mainz 05 in their second game earned Greuther Fürth their first ever win in the Bundesliga.

== Matches ==
=== Legend ===
Win Draw Loss Postponed

=== Friendly matches ===
29 June 2012	Sylvia Ebersdorf	0 – 10	Greuther Fürth	Ebersdorf
		Report	Azemi; Nöthe; Onuegbu; Klaus; Sararer	Stadium: Am Hügelsee

4 July 2012	Oberkotzau	1 – 10	Greuther Fürth	Oberkotzau
	Goal	Report	Onuegbu; Nöthe; Tyrała; Klaus; Pektürk; Azemi	Attendance: 2.000

7 July 2012	TSV Bergrheinfeld	1 – 17	Greuther Fürth	Bergrheinfeld
15:00		Report	Nöthe; Sararer; Asamoah; Nehrig; Petsos; Onuegbu; Tyrała; Pektürk; Peković; Sobiech; Klaus; Hefele; Own Goal	Stadium: Sportheim Bergrheinfeld

10 July 2012	Eintracht Bamberg	1 – 5	Greuther Fürth	Bamberg
18:30	Deptalla	Report	Onuegbu; Hefele; Asamoah; Azemi	Stadium: Fuchs-Park-Stadion; Attendance: 1.750

14 July 2012	TSV Höchstadt	0 – 18	Greuther Fürth	Höchstadt
		Report	11' 32' 37' Asamoah; 14' 27' Nöthe; 26' (o.g.); 41', 43' Sararer; 19' Kleine; 40' Prib; 50' 85' Stieber; 69' 78' Onuegbu; 73' 79' Fürstner; 75' Tyrała; 76' Pledl	Attendance: 2.000

24 July 2012	Unterhaching	0 – 5	Greuther Fürth	Ingolstadt
18:00		Report	18' Asamoah; 51' Sararer; Onuegbu; Tyrała

28 July 2012	Greuther Fürth	2 – 1	Sivasspor	Walchsee
	Tyrała; Nehrig	Report	Chahechouhe

30 July 2012	Greuther Fürth	3 – 2	Akhisarspor	Miesbach
18:30	Peković 30'; Azemi 50'; Prib 50'	Report		Attendance: 250

2 August 2012	Greuther Fürth	0 – 1	Trabzonspor	Rosenheim
		Report	77' Alanzinho	Attendance: 800

3 August 2012	1912 Markt Weiltingen	0 – 14	Greuther Fürth	Weiltingen
		Report	Azemi; Klaus; Stieber; Geis; Peković; Asamoah	Stadium: Hauptplatz TV Markt Weiltingen

8 August 2012	ASV Zirndorf	0 – 9	Greuther Fürth	Zirndorf
18:30		Report	Azemi; Mikkelsen; Onuegbu; Baba; Stieber; Asamoah	Stadium: Willi-Knapp-Sportanlage; Attendance: 1.300

10 August 2012	Greuther Fürth	1 – 1	Stoke City	Fürth
18:30	Nehrig 40'	Report	3' Kightly	Stadium: Trolli Arena; Attendance: 3,750

28 August 2012	Greuther Fürth	2 – 1	Dubai Sports Club	Fürth
16:00	Pledl 18'; Onuegbu 73'	Report	Goal	Stadium: Auf der Tulpe

=== Bundesliga ===
25 August 2012 1	Greuther Fürth	0–3	Bayern Munich	Fürth
15:30 CEST		Report	43' Müller; 59' Mandžukić; 78' Robben	Stadium: Trolli Arena; Attendance: 18,000; Referee: Peter Gagelmann

31 August 2012 2	Mainz 05	0–1	Greuther Fürth	Mainz
20:30 CEST		Report	67' Klaus	Stadium: Coface Arena; Attendance: 28,237; Referee: Tobias Stieler

15 September 2012 3	Greuther Fürth	0–2	Schalke 04	Fürth
18:30 CEST		Report	48' Draxler; 86' Holtby	Stadium: Trolli Arena; Attendance: 18,000; Referee: Florian Meyer

22 September 2012 4	VfL Wolfsburg	1–1	Greuther Fürth	Wolfsburg
15:30 CEST	Olić 42'	Report	27' (o.g.) Pogatetz	Stadium: Volkswagen Arena; Attendance: 25,552; Referee: Markus Schmidt

25 September 2012 5	Greuther Fürth	0–2	Fortuna Düsseldorf	Fürth
20:00 CEST		Report	26' Fink; 33' Ilsø	Stadium: Trolli Arena; Attendance: 16,573; Referee: Tobias Welz

29 September 2012 6	Bayer Leverkusen	2–0	Greuther Fürth	Leverkusen
15:30 CEST	Sam 50', 62'	Report		Stadium: BayArena; Attendance: 25,798; Referee: Guido Winkmann

6 October 2012 7	Greuther Fürth	0–1	Hamburg	Fürth
15:30 CEST		Report	17' Son	Stadium: Trolli Arena; Attendance: 18,000; Referee: Thorsten Kinhöfer

19 October 2012 8	1899 Hoffenheim	3–3	Greuther Fürth	Sinsheim
20:30 CEST	Firmino 8'; Joselu 67', 89'	Report	Stieber 39'; Prib 84'; Sobiech 90+3'	Stadium: Rhein-Neckar Arena; Attendance: 22,150; Referee: Daniel Siebert

27 October 2012 9	Greuther Fürth	1–1	Werder Bremen	Fürth
15:30 CEST	Edu 8'	Report	Petersen 44'	Stadium: Trolli Arena; Attendance: 18,000; Referee: Tobias Stieler

2 November 2012 10	Eintracht Frankfurt	1–1	Greuther Fürth	Frankfurt
20:30 CET	Meier 1'	Report	Stieber 53'	Stadium: Commerzbank-Arena; Attendance: 47,400; Referee: Markus Schmidt

11 November 2012 11	Greuther Fürth	2–4	Borussia Mönchengladbach	Fürth
17:30	Nehrig 10' (pen.); Kleine (red card) 12'; Prib 43'; Peković (yellow card) 78' (yellow-red card) 90+1'; Mavraj (yellow card) 81'	Report (in German)	Wendt 22'; Stranzl 51'; Herrmann 57'; Marx 90+2' (pen.)	Stadium: Trolli Arena; Attendance: 18,000; Referee: Peter Gagelmann

17 November 2012 12	Borussia Dortmund	3–1	Greuther Fürth	Dortmund
15:30 CET	Lewandowski 3', 15' (pen.) (yellow card) 12'; Perišić (yellow card) 20'; Götze 42'	Report (in German)	Stieber 5'; Azemi (yellow card) 34'; Schmidtgal (yellow card) 64'	Stadium: Westfalenstadion; Attendance: 80,645; Referee: Jochen Drees

24 November 2012 13	Greuther Fürth	0–0	1. FC Nürnberg	Fürth
15:30 CET	Sararer (yellow card) 38' (yellow-red card) 71'; Nehrig (yellow card) 63'; Schmidtgal (yellow card) 88'	Report (in German)	Pinola (yellow card) 22'; Feulner (red card) 35'; Frantz (yellow card) 88'	Stadium: Trolli Arena; Attendance: 18,000; Referee: Felix Brych

27 November 2012 14	Hannover 96	2–0	Greuther Fürth	Hannover
20:00	Diouf 4'; Eggimann 69'; Schmiedebach (yellow card) 73'	Report	Kleine (yellow card) 76'	Stadium: AWD-Arena; Attendance: 32,300; Referee: Marco Fritz

1 December 2012 15	Greuther Fürth	0–1	VfB Stuttgart	Fürth
15:30 CET	Nöthe (yellow card) 53'; Peković (yellow card) 54'; Kleine (yellow card) 69'; Schmidtgal (yellow card) 69'; Zillner (yellow card) 88'	Report (in German)	Ibišević (penalty missed) (yellow card) 54'; Okazaki 45'; Traoré (yellow card) 51'; Tasci (red card) 53'; Kuzmanović (yellow card) 62'; Ulreich (yellow card) 86'	Stadium: Trolli Arena; Attendance: 17,443; Referee: Thorsten Kinhöfer

8 December 2012 16	Freiburg	1–0	Greuther Fürth	Freiburg
15:30 CET	Caligiuri 15'; Sorg (yellow card) 47'; Günter (yellow card) 84'	Report (in German)	Kleine (yellow card) 7'; Asamoah (yellow card) 33'; Baba (yellow card) 59'; Nehrig (yellow card) 78'	Stadium: Mage Solar Stadion; Attendance: 22,600; Referee: Knut Kircher

15 December 2012 17	Greuther Fürth	1–1	Augsburg	Fürth
15:30	Sobiech 69'	Report	Mölders 9'	Stadium: Trolli Arena; Attendance: 16,340; Referee: Felix Zwayer

19 January 2013 18	Bayern Munich	2–0	Greuther Fürth	München
15:30	Mandžukić 29', 61'	Report		Stadium: Allianz Arena; Attendance: 71,000; Referee: Markus Schmidt

26 January 2013 19	Greuther Fürth	0–3	Mainz 05	Fürth
15:30		Report	Szalai 53', 84'; Mallı 65'	Stadium: Trolli Arena; Attendance: 14,425; Referee: Marco Fritz

2 February 2013 20	Schalke 04	1–2	Greuther Fürth	Gelsenkirchen
15:30	Bastos 47'	Report	Klaus 52'; Đurđić 90+2'	Stadium: Veltins-Arena; Attendance: 60,693; Referee: Bastian Dankert

9 February 2013 21	Greuther Fürth	0–1	Wolfsburg	Fürth
15:30		Report	Dost 23'	Stadium: Trolli Arena; Attendance: 15,045; Referee: Guido Winkmann

16 February 2013 22	Fortuna Düsseldorf	1–0	Greuther Fürth	Düsseldorf
15:30	Bellinghausen 18'	Report		Stadium: Esprit Arena; Attendance: 37,378; Referee: Tobias Welz

24 February 2013 23	Greuther Fürth	0–0	Bayer Leverkusen	Fürth
17:30		Report		Stadium: Trolli Arena; Attendance: 14,635; Referee: Dr. Jochen Drees

2 March 2013 24	Hamburg	1–1	Greuther Fürth	Hamburg
15:30	Beister 21'	Report	Đurđić 14'	Stadium: Imtech-Arena; Attendance: 47,206; Referee: Daniel Siebert

9 March 2013 25	Greuther Fürth	0–3	1899 Hoffenheim	Fürth
15:30		Report	Firmino 10'; Joselu 16'; Weis 50'	Stadium: Trolli Arena; Attendance: 15,760; Referee: Knut Kircher

16 March 2013 26	Werder Bremen	2–2	Greuther Fürth	Bremen
15:30	Hunt 47', 70'	Report	Fürstner 55'; Petsos 62'	Stadium: Weserstadion; Attendance: 39,786; Referee: Markus Schmidt

31 March 2013 27	Greuther Fürth	2–3	Eintracht Frankfurt	Fürth
17:30	Đurđić 2'; Sararer 72'	Report	Inui 12'; Aigner 58'; Meier 68'	Stadium: Trolli Arena; Attendance: 18,000; Referee: Dr. Jochen Drees

6 April 2013 28	Borussia Mönchengladbach	1–0	Greuther Fürth	Mönchengladbach
15:30	De Jong 74'	Report		Stadium: Stadion im Borussia-Park; Attendance: 50,206; Referee: Bastian Dankert

13 April 2013 29	Greuther Fürth	1–6	Borussia Dortmund	Fürth
15:30	Prib 71'	Report	Götze 12', 45'; Gündoğan 15', 33'; Błaszczykowski 29'; Lewandowski 80'	Stadium: Trolli Arena; Attendance: 18,000; Referee: Marco Fritz

21 April 2013 30	1. FC Nürnberg	0–1	Greuther Fürth	Nürnberg
17:30		Report	Geis 27'	Stadium: Grundig-Stadion; Attendance: 50,000; Referee: Manuel Gräfe

26 April 2013 31	Greuther Fürth	2–3	Hannover 96	Fürth
20:30	Đurđić 41', 83'	Report	Abdellaoue 39'; Hoffmann 71'; Pinto 87'	Stadium: Trolli Arena; Attendance: 15,370; Referee: Thorsten Kinhöfer

4 May 2013 32	VfB Stuttgart	0–2	Greuther Fürth	Stuttgart
15:30		Report	Sakai 51' (og.); Azemi 89'	Stadium: Mercedes-Benz Arena; Attendance: 48,300; Referee: Guido Winkmann

11 May 2013 33	Greuther Fürth	1–2	Freiburg	Fürth
15:30	Zimmermann 3'	Report	Schmid 69'; Kruse 78'	Stadium: Trolli Arena; Attendance: 16,735; Referee: Daniel Siebert

18 May 2013 34	Augsburg	3–1	Greuther Fürth	Augsburg
15:30	Werner 30'; Callsen-Bracker 55'; Ji 75'	Report	Trinks 61'	Stadium: SGL Arena; Attendance: 30,112; Referee: Tobias Welz

=== DFB-Pokal ===
18 August 2012 1st Rnd	Kickers Offenbach	2–0	Greuther Fürth	Offenbach
20:30	Rathgeber 28'; Bender 90'	Report		Stadium: Sparda Bank Hessen Stadium; Attendance: 7,620; Referee: Christian Dingert

== Squad ==
=== Squad and statistics ===
As of 23 May 2013

Squad Season 2012–13
No.	Player	Nat.	Birthday	at SVGF since	Previous club	League matches	League goals	Cup matches	Cup goals
Goalkeepers
1	Wolfgang Hesl	German	13 Jan 1986	2012	Dynamo Dresden	15	0	0	0
26	Max Grün	German	5 Apr 1987	2009	Bayern Munich	17	0	1	0
29	Issa Ndoye	Senegalese	12 Dec 1985	2012	Volyn Lutsk	0	0	0	0
Defenders
2	Lasse Sobiech	German	18 Jan 1991	2012	Borussia Dortmund	22	2	0	0
4	Kevin Kraus	German	12 Aug 1992	2011	Eintracht Frankfurt	1	0	0	0
5	Mërgim Mavraj (Captain)	Albanian	9 Jun 1986	2011	Bochum	31	0	1	0
6	Heinrich Schmidtgal	Kazakhstani	20 Nov 1985	2011	Rot-Weiß Oberhausen	18	0	0	0
7	Bernd Nehrig	German	28 Sep 1988	2007	Stuttgart	25	1	1	0
15	Michael Hefele	German	1 Sep 1990	2012	Unterhaching	1	0	0	0
18	Baba Rahman	Ghanaian	2 Jul 1994	2012	Asante Kotoko	19	0	1	0
19	Thomas Kleine	German	28 Dec 1977	2010	Borussia Mönchengladbach	21	0	1	0
30	Johannes Geis	German	17 Aug 1993	2008	Youth system	6	1	0	0
38	Matthias Zimmermann	German	16 Jun 1992	2012	Borussia Mönchengladbach	13	1	0	0
Midfielders
8	Stephan Fürstner	German	11 Sep 1987	2009	Bayern Munich	29	1	1	0
10	Sebastian Tyrala	Pole	21 Jul 1989	2011	Osnabrück	1	0	1	0
13	Milorad Peković	Montenegrin	5 Aug 1977	2010	Mainz 05	18	0	0	0
14	Edgar Prib	Russian	15 Dec 1989	2006	Youth system	26	3	1	0
16	Zoltán Stieber	Hungarian	16 Oct 1988	2012	Mainz 05	16	3	0	0
17	Thomas Pledl	German	23 May 1994	2012	1860 München	6	0	0	0
21	Robert Zillner	German	4 Aug 1985	2011	Unterhaching	6	0	0	0
22	Thanos Petsos	Greek	5 Jun 1991	2012	Bayer Leverkusen	13	1	1	0
23	Sercan Sararer	Turkish	27 Nov 1989	2000	Youth system	22	1	1	0
27	Florian Trinks	German	11 Mar 1992	2013	Werder Bremen	2	1	0	0
32	Park Jung-bin	South Korean	18 Sep 1986	2013	Wolfsburg II	9	0	0	0
34	József Varga	German	6 June 1988	2013	Debrecen	6	0	0	0
36	Felix Klaus	German	13 Sep 1992	2007	Youth system	23	2	0	0
Strikers
9	Christopher Nöthe	German	3 Jan 1988	2009	Borussia Dortmund	13	0	1	0
11	Gerald Asamoah	German	3 Oct 1978	2012	St. Pauli	17	0	1	0
24	Djiby Fall	Senegalese	20 Apr 1985	2012	Lokeren	2	0	0	0
32	Edu	Brazilian	30 Nov 1981	2012	Schalke 04	10	1	0	0
33	Ilir Azemi	Kosovar	21 Feb 1992	2007	Youth system	18	0	0	0
40	Nikola Đurđić	Serbian	1 Apr 1986	2013	Helsingborg	14	5	0	0
Players who left the club during the 2012-13 season
	Tayfun Pektürk	German	13 May 1988	2010	Eintracht Trier 05	3	0	0	0
Last updated: 23 May 2013

=== Transfers ===
==== In ====
No.	Pos.	Nat.	Name	Age	EU	Moving from	Type	Transfer window	Ends	Transfer fee	Source
1	GK	(Germany)	Wolfgang Hesl	26	EU	Dynamo Dresden	Transfer	Summer	2014	Free	
2	DF	(Germany)	Lasse Sobiech	21	EU	Borussia Dortmund	Loan	Summer	2013	€100,000	
15	DF	(Germany)	Michael Hefele	21	EU	Unterhaching	Transfer	Summer	2013	Free	
16	MF	(Hungary)	Zoltán Stieber	23	EU	Mainz 05	Transfer	Summer	2016	Free	
17	MF	(Germany)	Thomas Pledl	18	EU	1860 München	Transfer	Summer	2016	Free	
18	DF	(Ghana)	Baba Rahman	18	Non-EU	Asante Kotoko (Ghana)	Transfer	Summer	2017	Free	
22	MF	(Greece)	Thanos Petsos	21	EU	Bayer Leverkusen	Transfer	Summer	2015	€50,000	
24	FW	(Senegal)	Djiby Fall	27	Non-EU	Lokeren (Belgium)	Transfer	Summer	2015	€800,000	
27	FW	(Denmark)	Tobias Mikkelsen	25	EU	Nordsjælland (Denmark)	Transfer	Summer	2015	€500,000	
29	GK	(Senegal)	Issa Ndoye	26	Non-EU	Volyn Lutsk (Ukraine)	Transfer	Summer	2013	Free	
32	FW	(Brazil)	Edu	30	Non-EU	Schalke 04	Loan	Summer	2012		
	FW	(Cameroon)	Frank Ohandza	21	Non-EU	Buriram (Thailand)	Loan	Summer	2013	€50,000	

==== Out ====
No.	Pos.	Name	Age	EU	Moving to	Type	Transfer Window	Transfer fee	Sources
3	DF	Fabian Baumgärtel	23	EU	Alemannia Aachen	Loan	Summer		
3	DF	Asen Karaslavov	32	EU	Botev Plovdiv	Released	Summer		
5	DF	Christian Dorda	23	EU	Heracles Almelo	Released	Summer	Free	
9	FW	Olivier Occéan	30	EU	Eintracht Frankfurt	Sold	Summer	€1,500,000	
12	FW	Kingsley Onuegbu	26	Non EU	Sandhausen	Loan	Summer		
16	GK	Jasmin Fejzić	26	Non EU	VfR Aalen	Released	Summer		
20	FW	Dani Schahin	23	EU	Fortuna Düsseldorf	Released	Summer	Free	
30	GK	Franco Flückiger	21	EU	Hallescher FC	Released	Summer		
40	MF	Stephan Schröck	26	EU	1899 Hoffenheim	Released	Summer	Free	
