= Zoltán Stieber =

Hungarian footballer

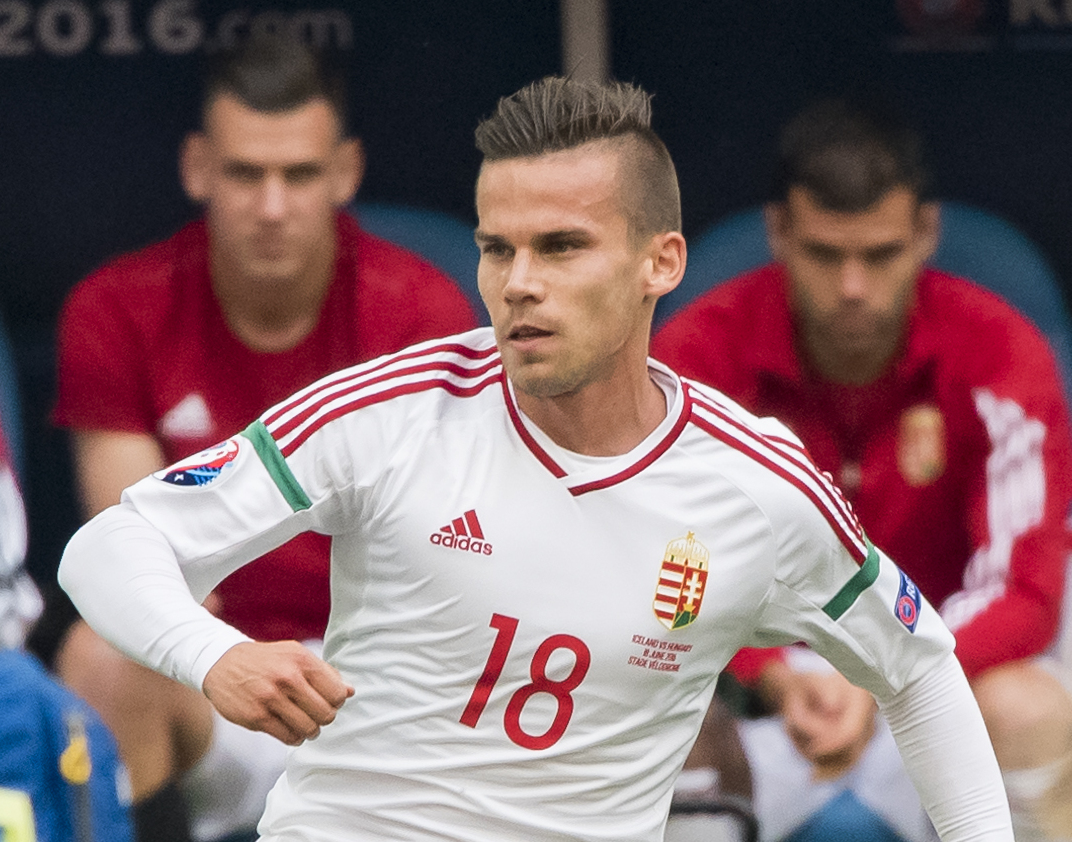
- Stieber representing Hungary at UEFA Euro 2016

Personal information
- Date of birth: 16 October 1988 (age 38)
- Place of birth: Sárvár, Hungary
- Height: 1.75 m (5 ft 9 in)
- Positions: Winger; attacking midfielder

Youth career
- 1995–1999: Sárvári FC
- 1999–2001: Győri ETO
- 2001–2002: Goldball '94
- 2002–2005: Újpest
- 2005–2007: Aston Villa

Senior career*
Years	Team	Apps	(Gls)
2007–2009	Aston Villa	0	(0)
2007–2008	→ Yeovil Town (loan)	15	(1)
2009–2010	TuS Koblenz	38	(5)
2010–2011	Alemannia Aachen	34	(10)
2011–2012	Mainz 05	7	(0)
2011–2012	→ Mainz 05 II	3	(0)
2012–2014	Greuther Fürth	48	(12)
2012	→ Greuther Fürth II	1	(0)
2014–2016	Hamburger SV	27	(3)
2016	→ 1. FC Nürnberg (loan)	6	(1)
2016–2017	1. FC Kaiserslautern	19	(1)
2017–2019	D.C. United	44	(6)
2019–2020	Zalaegerszeg	22	(2)
2020–2022	Újpest	24	(2)
2020	→ Újpest II	1	(1)
2022–2025	MTK Budapest	89	(16)
Total		378	(60)

International career^{‡}
2006–2008	Hungary U19	5	(0)
2008–2009	Hungary U20	3	(0)
2009	Hungary U21	1	(0)
2011–2018	Hungary	26	(3)
- * Club domestic league appearances and goals as of 19 June 2025 ‡ National team caps and goals as of 29 May 2020

Zoltán Stieber (Hungarian pronunciation: [ˈzoltaːn ˈʃtiːbɛr]; born 16 October 1988) is a Hungarian former professional footballer who played as a winger or attacking midfielder. Having spent time in a number of Hungarian youth sides Stieber spent four years with the academy of Premier League side Aston Villa before moving to Germany where he worked his way up the league system. He became a regular international player for the Hungary national team including in their Euro 2016 finals squad.

== Club career ==
Stieber initially played for Budapest-based Goldball '94 alongside younger brother András, before moving to Hungarian giants Újpest. After impressing for the capital side, he was offered trials with a selection of English clubs. He had an unsuccessful trials with Arsenal and Manchester United prior to signing a youth contract with Aston Villa where he played for four years.

=== Aston Villa ===
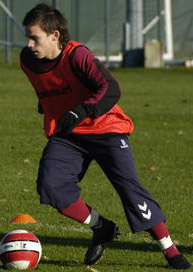
Stieber training for Aston Villa

Stieber signed a two-year contract with Aston Villa in May 2005 and quickly impressed Tony McAndrew with his performances for the Academy. In total, he made 30 appearances for the academy, scoring 4 goals in his debut season. He was part of the squad that got to the Play-offs Final of the FA Premier Academy League in May 2006, which Villa lost 3–2 against Southampton. He also made six substitute appearances for the Reserves in the 2005–06 season.

Stieber appeared 13 times for Aston Villa Reserves in the 2006–07 season, scoring two goals, against Fulham and Chelsea. He was also involved in producing a memorable hat-trick of assists, to help gain victory over Reading in a 3–0 win. On 4 January 2007, Stieber signed a two–year contract with the club, keeping him until 2009.

In late May 2007, Stieber guided Aston Villa to success in the 2007 HKFC Philips Lighting International Soccer Sevens, scoring a spectacular winner against City Academy Hong Kong to book a place in the knock-out stages. He then went on to lead the Midlands club to victory against Urawa Red Diamonds, PSV and finally Central Coast Mariners FC to secure the trophy, in a competition which has brought notable success to Aston Villa in the past. His efforts in the competition were also rewarded with the Player of the Tournament trophy – succeeding last years winner – Gabriel Agbonlahor. After this success, he was rewarded with a three-year contract at Aston Villa – the longest given to any of the seven contractee's – thus showing the promise and potential shown in the young Hungarian.

In July 2007, Stieber was given his first taste of first-team action, when he was called up to the senior squad for the tour of the U.S. and Canada. He made his debut against Toronto and impressed against the Major League Soccer team, he also appeared in a further pre-season match against Walsall, in which he assisted the first goal of the game. Despite not making a competitive breakthrough to the senior team, he made a positive impression for Aston Villa Reserves that season, scoring against Fulham and Portsmouth and chalking up 6 assists in the opening 6 matches. This led the young midfielder to be awarded the first ever BBC Radio West Midlands Young Player of the Month, on 20 September 2007.

Like the previous season, Stieber was again involved with the first-team prior to the beginning of the new campaign. In early July 2008, he was called up to a 21-man squad for the tour of Switzerland, but only played 20 minutes – all in the 6–0 victory over FC Wil 1900. Further appearances against Lincoln City, Walsall and Reading followed, the majority of which were played in an unaccustomed left-back role. He never saw competitive first-team action at Villa Park, so the club allowed him to participate in trials at other clubs.

==== Yeovil Town (loan) ====
On 22 November 2007, Stieber joined League One side Yeovil Town on loan until 1 January 2008. Upon joining the club, Manager Russell Slade commented on Stieber, attributing his style on ‘dead-ball situations and a great crosser of the ball.’

Stieber made his Yeovil Town debut two days later on 24 November 2007, in a 2–1 loss against Millwall and scored his first goal days before his loan spell ran out, in the 2–1 victory over Brighton & Hove Albion. He made an immediate impact for the "Glovers" and his loan deal was extended until the end of January.

However, Stieber suffered a thigh injury in training and made his return to the first team on 29 March 2008, in a 0–0 draw against Bristol Rovers, which turns out to be his last appearance. After making 15 appearances, Stieber's loan spell at Yeovil Town came to an end.

=== TuS Koblenz ===
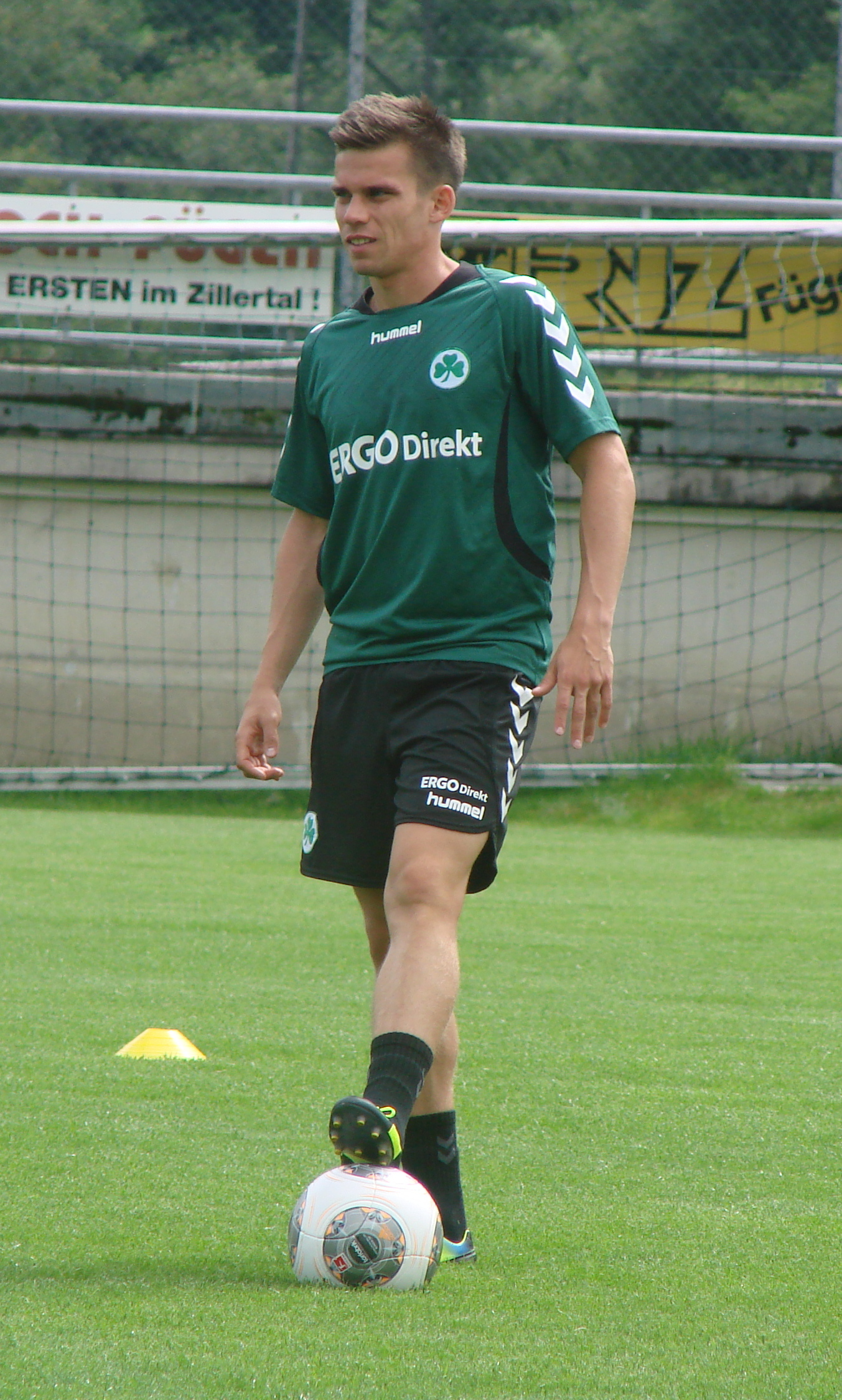
Stieber training with Greuther Fürth

Stieber trained with Blackpool for a short period and was also offered a trial by Norwich City. However, he decided to join TuS Koblenz on 29 January 2009 after a successful trial signing a 2.5-year contract until 30 June 2011.

He made his 2. Bundesliga début on 30 January 2009, as a 64th-minute substitute for Frank Wiblishauser in a 0–0 draw with Rot-Weiß Oberhausen. His first start came on 6 February 2009, against FSV Frankfurt. A week later, he scored his first 2. Bundesliga goal and recorded his first assist in a match against SV Wehen Wiesbaden. Stieber later scored four more goals in seventeen appearances against Greuther Fürth, Osnabrück, Duisburg and Freiburg.

The 2009–10 season started well for Stieber when he provided two assists, in the first round of DFB–Pokal, in a 4–0 win over Concordia and then scored his first goal of the season in the second round of DFB–Pokal, in a 4–2 win over Energie Cottbus. However, Stieber's appearance in the 2009–10 season was restricted to 21 appearances, due to injuries.

=== Alemannia Aachen ===
With a one–year contract left remaining, it was announced on 26 May 2010, Stieber left TuS Koblenz and signed for Alemannia Aachen on two–year contract, keeping him until 2012.

Stieber made his Alemannia Aachen debut, in the opening game of the season, where he set up one of the goals, in a 2–2 draw against Union Berlin on 20 August 2010. Stieber then scored his first Alemannia Aachen goal on 17 September 2010, in a 3–2 loss against Energie Cottbus. He went to score two more goals in three matches against FSV Frankfurt and Paderborn 07. By the end of 2010, Stieber scored one more goal, which came against Ingolstadt 04 on 17 October 2010.

As the season progressed towards the end of the 2010–11 season, Stieber scored his first goal of 2011 and set up two of the four goals, in a 4–2 win over Karlsruher SC on 22 January 2011. In Stieber's first game following the announcement came on 3 April 2011, in a 2–1 win over 1860 Munich. Stieber later added five more goals, including a brace against Rot-Weiß Oberhausen and set up one of the goals, in a 4–0 win on 29 April 2011. Playing in a three-man attack under the management of Peter Hyballa, Stieber finished the 2010–11 season at Alemannia Aachen, where he played all 34 matches in the league and scoring ten times, making the club's top–scorer. Additionally, Stieber's average grade of 3.03 passes made him the best fielders in the league in the 2010–11 season.

=== Mainz 05 ===
On 22 March 2011, it was announced that Stieber was to sign for Bundesliga side 1. FSV Mainz 05 on a four-year contract at the end of the 2010–11 season.

Stieber made his Mainz 05 debut, in the opening game of the season, where he made his start and played 71 minutes, in a 2–0 win over Bayer Leverkusen. Two weeks later, on 21 August 2011, Stieber provided an assist to set up one of the Mainz 05's goals, in a 4–2 loss against Schalke 04. However, Stieber struggled in the first team at Mainz 05, having been spent most of the substitute bench and his own injury concerns. At one point, Stieber was expected to leave the club on loan in the January transfer window, but the club refused to leave him leave.

After a poor season with Mainz 05, Stieber was expecting to leave the club despite having three years left to his contract.

=== Greuther Fürth ===
On 21 June 2012 it was announced that Stieber signed for Bundesliga side Greuther Fürth on a four-year contract. This came after they confirmed their interest signing Stieber.

Stieber made his Greuther Fürth debut, in the opening game of the season, where he came on as a substitute for Sebastian Tyrała in the 69th minute, in a 3–0 loss against Bayern Munich. After spending weeks on the sidelines with a gastrointestinal problems, Stieber scored his first Bundesliga goal against 1899 Hoffenheim, just two weeks after making his return to the first team and the score was a 3–3 draw. Stieber then scored two more goals against Eintracht Frankfurt and Borussia Dortmund. However, Stieber suffered a shoulder, which he sustained ahead of a match against Wolfsburg, and was sidelined for three months. After returning to training a month later, Stieber returned to the first team in the last game of the season, where he played 11 minutes, in a 3–1 loss against Augsburg. The 2012–13 season ultimately saw Greuther Fürth relegated from the German top flight. Despite this, Stieber made seventeen appearances and scoring three times in all competitions.

At the start of the new season, Stieber performed strongly, as he had 3 goals and 6 assists in just 9 games, where he scored twice against Union Berlin and once against Dynamo Dresden, where he provided a hat–trick in an eventual 4–0 win. Between 2 November 2013 and 8 November 2013, Stieber scored three goals in two matches against Erzgebirge Aue and scoring twice against Paderborn. Stieber went on to score three goals later in the 2013–14 season against Sandhausen (which he also scored against them in another encounter in the last game of the season) and Fortuna Düsseldorf. In his final season for Fürth, in the 2. Bundesliga, he scored 9 goals and made 11 assists in total of thirty–six appearances.

=== Hamburger SV ===
==== 2014–15 and 2015–16 seasons ====
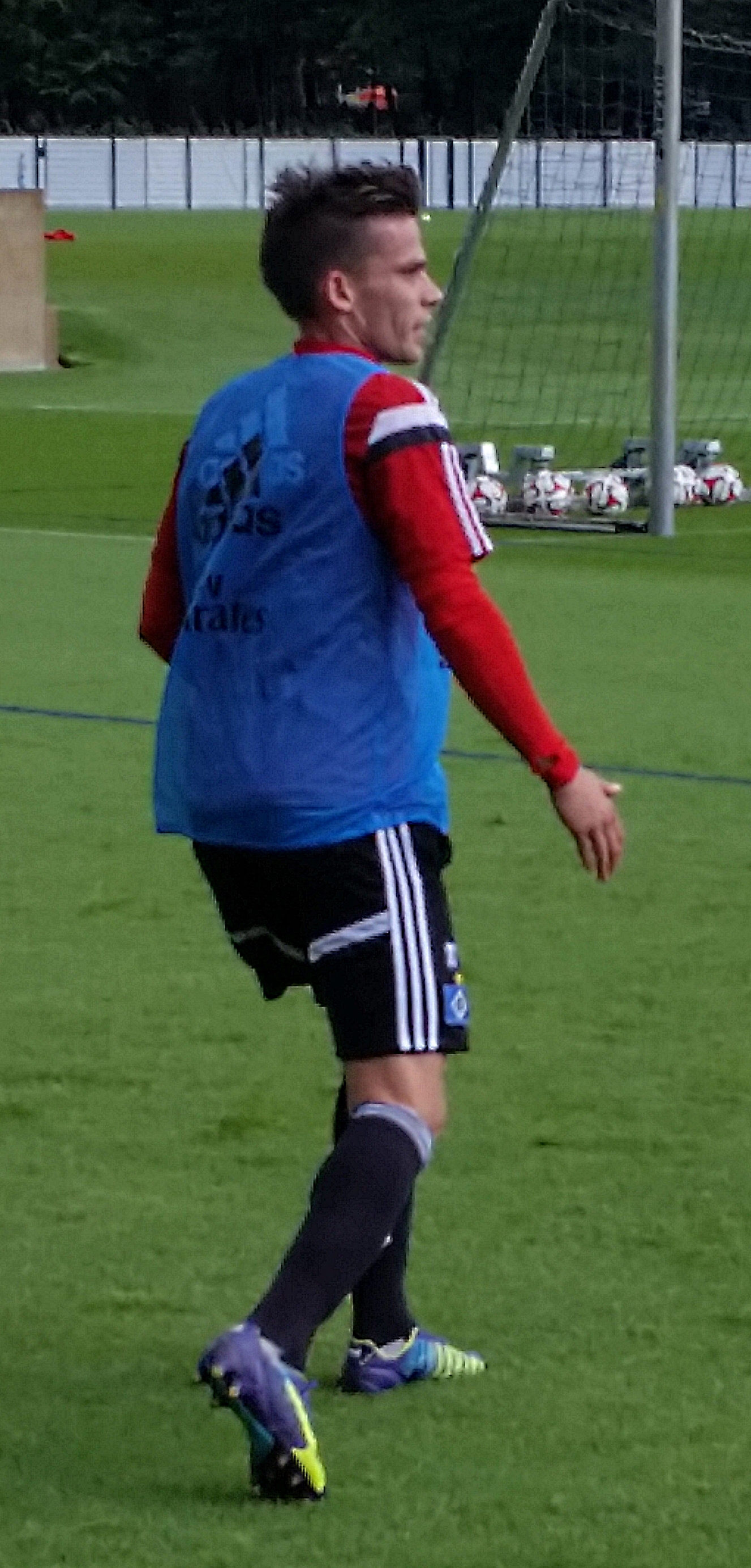
Stieber training for Hamburger SV

On 26 May 2014, Stieber signed for Bundesliga club Hamburg. In an interview with Nemzeti Sport, he admitted that he had signed the most lucrative contract of his career. Stieber was spotted by the Hamburg managers during the relegation play-offs of the 2013–14 Bundesliga season against Fürth. The first tie ended with a goalless draw, while the second tie finished with 1–1 which resulted that Hamburg could remain in the top flight of the Bundeliga. Stieber gave the assist on the return match.

Stieber made his Hamburger SV debut on 30 August 2014, where he played 45 minutes, in a 3–0 loss against Paderborn. In January 2015, Stieber played for the first time as a center in Hamburg against Eintracht Frankfurt in a friendly match. On 4 February, he scored his first goal in the 2014–15 Bundesliga season in a 3–0 victory over Paderborn in the 91st minute at the Benteler Arena, Paderborn, Germany. On 7 February 2015, he set the record of the highest distance in the 2014–15 Bundesliga by running 13.9 km against Hannover 96 at the Imtech-Arena, Hamburg.

Later in the 2014–15 Bundesliga, Stieber scored his first goal against Borussia Mönchengladbach at the Imtech Arena, in Hamburg on 22 February 2015. For the first time, he was able to score a goal in a consecutive match against Eintracht Frankfurt at the Commerzbank-Arena in Frankfurt on 28 February 2015 in the 2014–15 Bundesliga. However, the match ended with a 2–1 defeat for his team. Stieber ended the 2014–15 season, making thirty–eight appearances and scoring three times in all competitions.

In the 2015–16 season, however, saw Stieber's first team opportunities increasingly limited despite being fired up ahead of a new season. Stieber made his first appearance of the 2015–16 season, where he came on as a substitute for Nicolai Müller in the 87th minute, in a 1–0 win over 1899 Hoffenheim on 23 October 2015. In January transfer window, Stieber was expected to among players to leave the club.

==== 1. FC Nürnberg (loan) ====
On 18 January 2016, Stieber moved on loan to 1. FC Nürnberg. Stieber explained his decision to leave Hamburg, citing first team football in hopes of making to the Hungary squad for the UEFA Euro 2016.

Stieber made his 1. FC Nürnberg debut on 6 February 2016, where he made his first start for the club, in a 1–0 win over 1860 Munich. On 4 March 2016, he scored his first goal in the season at the Grundig-Stadion in Nürnberg against 1.FC Kaiserslautern in the 88th minute, but was sent–off in the last minute after a second bookable offence. Despite this, Stieber went on to make six appearances and scoring once for 1. FC Nürnberg later in the season.

=== Kaiserslautern ===
After returning from the national team, Stieber announced his desire to leave Hamburger SV in order to seek first team football. it was reported on 12 August 2016, Stieber signed a three-year contract with 1. FC Kaiserslautern.

Two days later, on 14 August 2016, Stieber made his Kaiserslautern debut, in the opening game of the season, where he played 26 minutes, in a 1–1 draw against Würzburger Kickers. Six days later on 20 August 2016, Stieber scored his first Kaiserslautern goal in the first round of DFB Pokal, in a 4–3 loss against Hallescher FC after the game went extra time.

=== D.C. United ===
On 9 August 2017, Stieber signed with Major League Soccer side D.C. United. On 27 September 2017, Stieber scored his first goal for D.C. United away against the New York Red Bulls. Stieber scored a rebounded free kick that brought the game level. The game ultimately ended in a 3–3 tie. Zoltan is well known for his great passing, free kicks, and his fast pace.

Stieber finished the 2017 season, one of D.C. United's worst seasons with only one goal and one assist. After D.C. United was able to improve and get their new stadium, Audi Field in 2018, Zoltan managed to score 5 goals and 7 assists in the 2018 season. Around 2018, Stieber was slowly being pushed out of the first team, due to new arrivals like Paul Arriola and Yamil Asad. This would even continue in 2019 after Asad left, when Lucas Rodriguez joined DC United and replaced Asad.

In June 2019, Stieber told a reporter that he desired to leave D.C. United in order to get more chances with the Hungary national team. He told the reporter "The US is too far away. I can't be a National Team player if I play here. I have to come closer to Hungary."

On 26 July 2019, D.C. United announced that they and Stieber had mutually parted ways. In total, Zoltan scored 6 goals and recorded 8 assists in his 44 appearances for D.C. United.

=== MTK Budapest ===
On 25 January 2022, Stieber signed with MTK Budapest. At the end of the 2021–22 season, MTK was relegated to the second-tier NB II, and Stieber made his debut on that level.

== International career ==
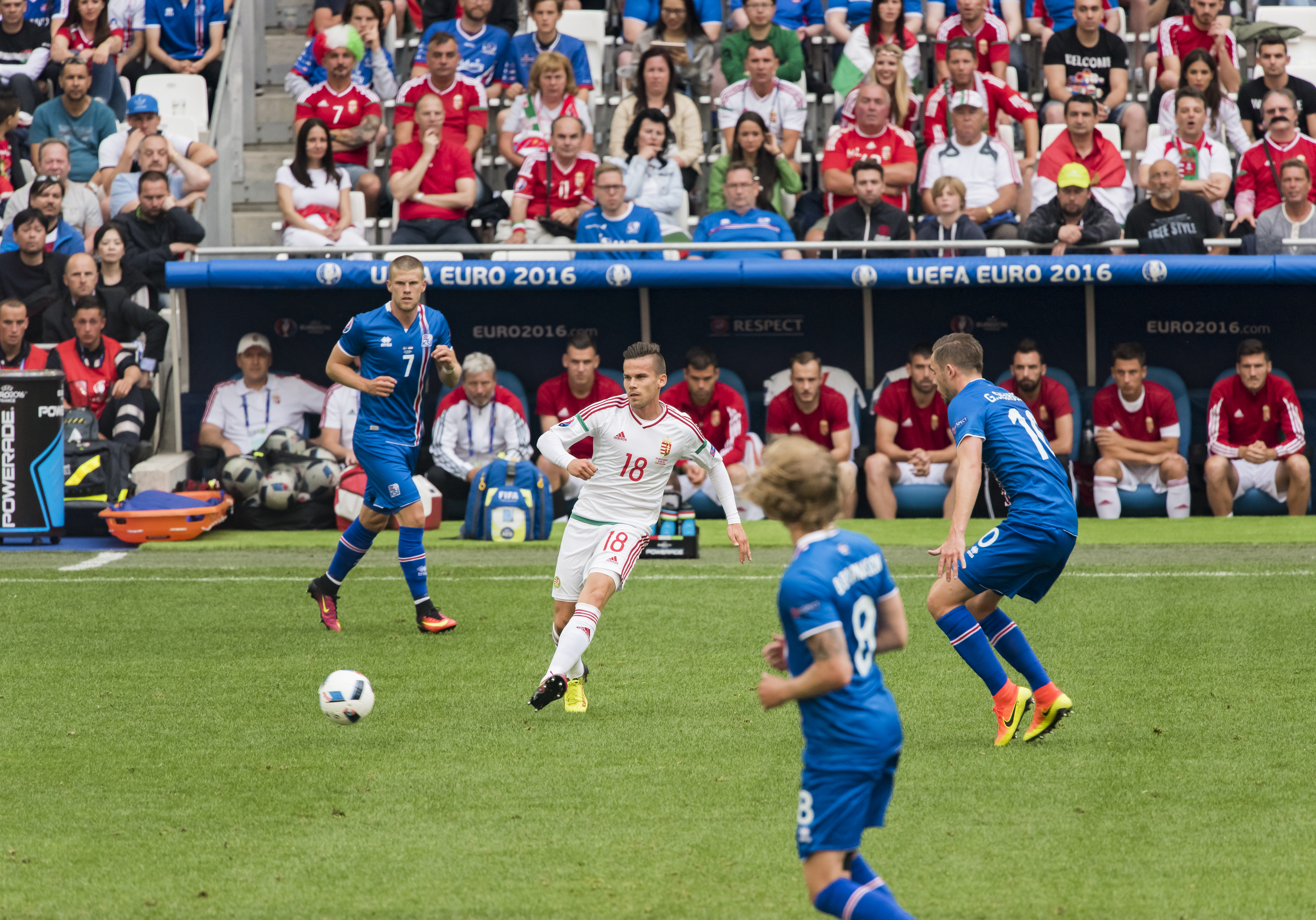
Stieber playing for Hungary in a group game against Iceland at the Euro 2016

Having previously represented Hungary U19, Hungary U20 and Hungary U21, Stieber was called–up by the national team for the first time and made his international début for Hungary, on 2 September 2011, in a 2–1 victory over Sweden. On 5 June 2015, Stieber scored his first goal for Hungary in a 4–0 friendly win over Lithuania in Debrecen. He followed this up with the winning goal in a 1–0 defeat of Finland in qualification for UEFA Euro 2016 on 13 June.

He was selected for Hungary's Euro 2016 squad. On 14 June 2016, Stieber played in the first group match in a 2–0 victory over Austria at the UEFA Euro 2016 Group F match at Nouveau Stade de Bordeaux, Bordeaux, France. He scored the second goal on a 2–0 win over Austria, in the first game of his team for the UEFA Euro 2016. Three days later on 18 June 2016 he played in a 1–1 draw against Iceland at the Stade Vélodrome, Marseille. He also played in the last group match in a 3–3 draw against Portugal at the Parc Olympique Lyonnais, Lyon on 22 June 2016. Steiber later described the UEFA Euro 2016 was an experience that he would never forget.

== Personal life ==
Stieber is the older brother of András Stieber, who also began his career at Goldball '94 and later played for the Aston Villa Under-21s with Zoltán. He currently also plays for Újpest in the Hungarian national league.

In May 2011, Stieber was involved in a car accident that left the driver in critical condition, while Stieber suffered an injured shin.

== Career statistics ==
=== Club ===
As of end of 2024–25 season

Appearances and goals by club, season and competition
Club	Season	League			National Cup (Note: Includes DFB-Pokal, U.S. Open Cup, Magyar Kupa)		League Cup		Other		Total	
Club	Season	Division	Apps	Goals	Apps	Goals	Apps	Goals	Apps	Goals	Apps	Goals
Aston Villa	2007–08	Premier League	0	0	0	0	0	0	—		0	0
Aston Villa	2008–09	Premier League	0	0	0	0	0	0	0	0	0	0
Aston Villa	Total		0	0	0	0	0	0	0	0	0	0
Yeovil Town (loan)	2007–08	League One	15	1	—		—		—		15	1
TuS Koblenz	2008–09	2. Bundesliga	17	5	0	0	—		—		17	5
TuS Koblenz	2009–10	2. Bundesliga	21	0	2	1	—		—		23	1
TuS Koblenz	Total		38	5	2	1	—		—		40	6
Alemannia Aachen	2010–11	2. Bundesliga	34	10	2	0	—		—		36	10
Mainz 05	2011–12	Bundesliga	7	0	1	0	—		1 (Note: Appearance in UEFA Europa League)	0	9	0
Mainz 05 II	2011–12	Regionalliga West	3	0	—		—		—		3	0
Greuther Fürth	2012–13	Bundesliga	16	3	0	0	—		—		16	3
Greuther Fürth	2013–14	2. Bundesliga	32	9	2	0	—		2 (Note: Appearances in the Bundesliga promotion/relegation play-off)	0	36	9
Greuther Fürth	Total		48	12	2	0	—		2	0	52	12
Greuther Fürth II	2012–13	Regionalliga Bayern	1	0	—		—		—		1	0
Hamburger SV	2014–15	Bundesliga	25	3	1	0	—		2	0	28	3
Hamburger SV	2015–16	Bundesliga	2	0	0	0	—		—		2	0
Hamburger SV	Total		27	3	1	0	—		2	0	30	3
1. FC Nürnberg (loan)	2015–16	2. Bundesliga	6	1	0	0	—		—		6	1
1. FC Kaiserslautern	2016–17	2. Bundesliga	19	1	1	1	—		—		20	2
D.C. United	2017	MLS	8	1	0	0	—		—		8	1
D.C. United	2018	MLS	27	5	1	0	—		1 (Note: Appearance in MLS Cup Playoffs)	0	29	5
D.C. United	2019	MLS	9	0	0	0	—		—		9	0
D.C. United	Total		44	6	1	0	—		1	0	46	6
Zalaegerszegi	2019–20	NB I	22	2	3	1	—		—		25	3
Újpest	2020–21	NB I	15	1	4	1	—		—		19	2
Újpest	2021–22	NB I	9	1	2	0	—		—		11	1
Újpest	Total		24	2	6	1	—		—		30	3
Újpest II	2020–21	NB III	1	1	—		—		—		1	1
MTK Budapest	2021–22	NB I	14	0	—		—		—		14	0
MTK Budapest	2022–23	NB II	28	11	2	0	—		—		30	11
MTK Budapest	2023–24	NB I	27	3	4	2	—		—		31	5
MTK Budapest	2024–25	NB I	20	2	3	1	—		—		23	3
MTK Budapest	Total		89	16	9	3	—		—		98	19
Career total			378	60	28	7	0	0	6	0	412	67

=== International ===
As of match played 8 September 2018.

Appearances and goals by national team and year
National team	Year	Apps	Goals
Hungary	2011	2	0
Hungary	2013	1	0
Hungary	2014	3	0
Hungary	2015	4	2
Hungary	2016	9	1
Hungary	2017	6	0
Hungary	2018	1	0
Total		26	3

As of match played 18 June 2016

Scores and results list Hungary's goal tally first, score column indicates score after each Stieber goal.

List of international goals scored by Zoltán Stieber
No.	Date	Venue	Cap	Opponent	Score	Result	Competition	Ref.
1	5 June 2015	Nagyerdei Stadion, Debrecen, Hungary	8	Lithuania	1–0	4–0	Friendly	
2	13 June 2015	Helsinki Olympic Stadium, Helsinki, Finland	9	Finland	1–0	1–0	UEFA Euro 2016 qualification	
3	14 June 2016	Nouveau Stade de Bordeaux, Bordeaux, France	13	Austria	2–0	2–0	UEFA Euro 2016	

== Honours ==
Individual

- Top assists in 2. Bundesliga: 2010–11 (17 assists)
- Best player in 2. Bundesliga: runner-Up 2010–11 (with 27 points)
