= Stephan Fürstner =

German footballer

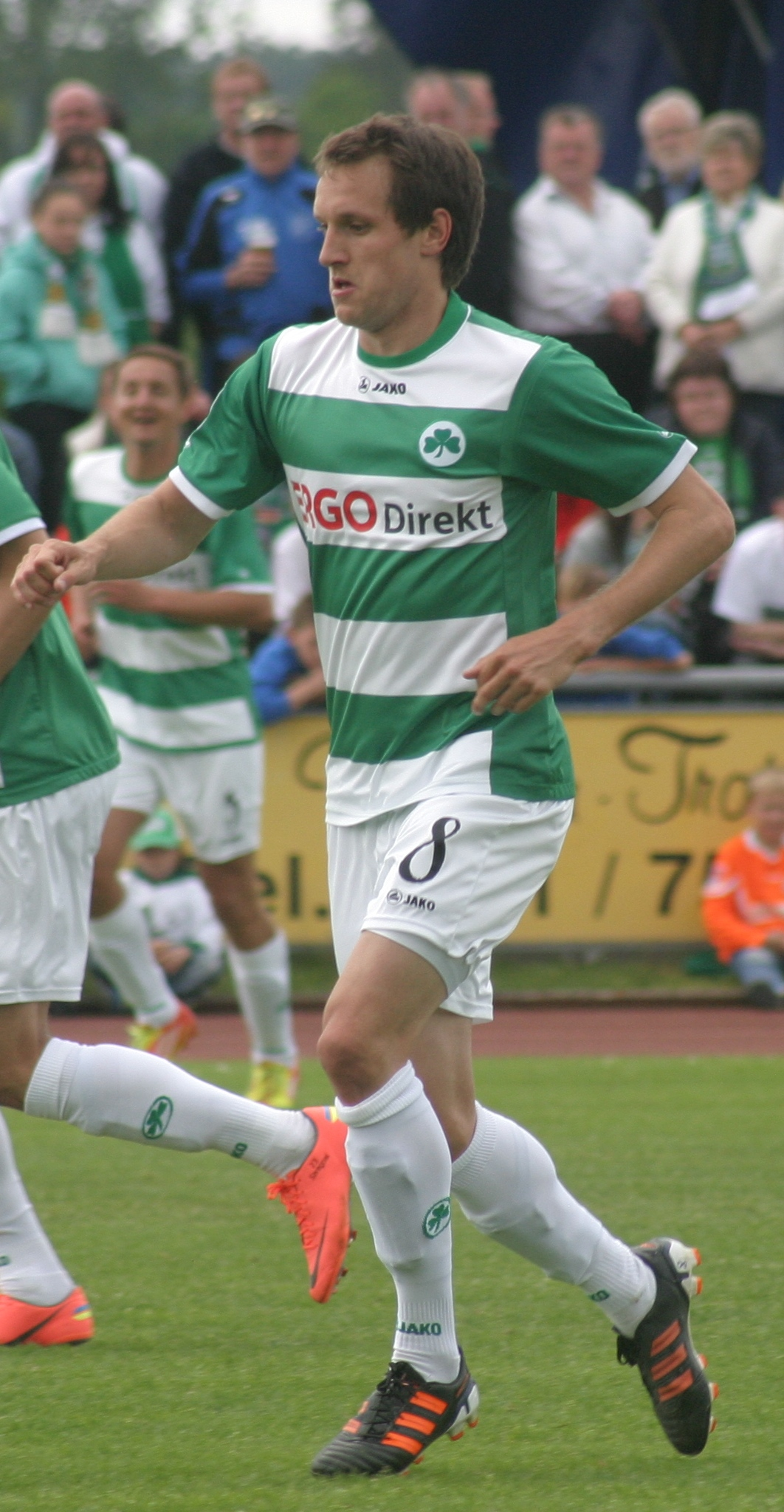
- Fürstner with Greuther Fürth in August 2012

Personal information
- Date of birth: 11 September 1987 (age 39)
- Place of birth: Munich, West Germany
- Height: 1.78 m (5 ft 10 in)
- Position: Midfielder

Youth career
- 1994–1998: MTV Dießen
- 1998–2005: Bayern Munich

Senior career*
Years	Team	Apps	(Gls)
2005–2009	Bayern Munich II	97	(5)
2006–2009	Bayern Munich	1	(0)
2009–2010	Greuther Fürth II	1	(0)
2009–2015	Greuther Fürth	164	(9)
2015–2018	Union Berlin	68	(1)
2018–2020	Eintracht Braunschweig	42	(1)
2020–2022	Mainz 05 II	46	(4)
2021–2022	Mainz 05	1	(0)
Total		420	(20)

International career
2006	Germany U-19	5	(0)
2007	Germany U-21	2	(0)
- * Club domestic league appearances and goals

Stephan Fürstner (born 11 September 1987) is a German former professional footballer who played as a midfielder.

== Career ==
=== Bayern Munich ===
For Bayern Munich II, in the 2005–06 season, he scored a goal in 20 appearances, and in the following season, he scored two goals in 26 appearances. He was promoted to Bayern Munich's main squad after playing 20 games in the 2005–06 season for Bayern's second team in the Regionalliga Süd. Fürstner has also played five matches for Germany's U-19 squad and two games for U-21 squad. He saw his first action with Bayern Munich's first-team in their 2006 friendly against New York Red Bulls at Giants Stadium. His only competitive match for the first team was on 5 May 2007 against Borussia Mönchengladbach when he came on in the 87th minute of a 1–1 draw. In his final two seasons at Bayern, he played a 50 matches scoring a goal in each season.

=== Greuther Fürth ===
Fürstner signed for Greuther Fürth on 5 June 2009. Since then, he became an integral part of the team which won the Second Bundesliga in 2012.

=== Union Berlin ===
Fürstner signed a contract with Union Berlin for two years plus an option year starting in the 2015–16 season. At the end of the 2017–18 season his contract expired and he left the club.

=== Eintracht Braunschweig ===
In June 2018, Fürstner signed for Eintracht Braunschweig.

== Career statistics ==
As of match played 24 March 2019

Club	Season	League			Cup^{1}		Other^{2}		Total		Ref.
Club	Season	League	Apps	Goals	Apps	Goals	Apps	Goals	Apps	Goals	Ref.
Bayern Munich II	2005–06	Regionalliga Süd	20	1	—		—		20	1	
Bayern Munich II	2006–07	Regionalliga Süd	26	2	—		—		26	2	
Bayern Munich II	2007–08	Regionalliga Süd	24	1	—		—		24	1	
Bayern Munich II	2008–09	3. Liga	27	1	—		—		27	1	
Bayern Munich II	Totals		97	5	—		—		97	5	—
Bayern Munich	2006–07	Bundesliga	1	0	0	0	—		1	0	
Greuther Fürth II	2009–10	Regionalliga Süd	1	0	—		—		1	0	
Greuther Fürth	2009–10	2. Bundesliga	22	1	3	0	—		25	1	
Greuther Fürth	2010–11	2. Bundesliga	26	1	0	0	—		26	1	
Greuther Fürth	2011–12	2. Bundesliga	27	2	4	0	—		31	2	
Greuther Fürth	2012–13	Bundesliga	30	1	1	0	—		31	1	
Greuther Fürth	2013–14	2. Bundesliga	27	4	2	0	2	1	31	5	
Greuther Fürth	2014–15	2. Bundesliga	32	0	2	0	—		34	0	
Greuther Fürth	Totals		164	9	12	0	2	1	178	10	—
Union Berlin	2015–16	2. Bundesliga	21	0	1	0	—		22	0	
Union Berlin	2016–17	2. Bundesliga	29	1	2	0	—		31	1	
Union Berlin	2017–18	2. Bundesliga	18	0	2	0	—		20	0	
Union Berlin	Totals		68	1	5	0	—		73	1	—
Eintracht Braunschweig	2018–19	3. Liga	34	1	0	0	—		34	1	
Eintracht Braunschweig	2019–20	3. Liga	8	0	0	0	—		8	0	
Eintracht Braunschweig	Totals		42	1	0	0	—		42	1	—
Career totals			373	16	17	0	2	1	392	17	—

- 1.Includes German Cup.
- 2.Includes promotion playoff.

== Honours ==
Bayern Munich

- 2. Bundesliga: 2011–12
- Bundesliga: 2005–06, 2007–08
- DFB-Pokal: 2005–06, 2007–08
- DFB-Ligapokal: 2007
- IFA Shield: 2005
