= Ilir Azemi =

Kosovar footballer (born 1992)

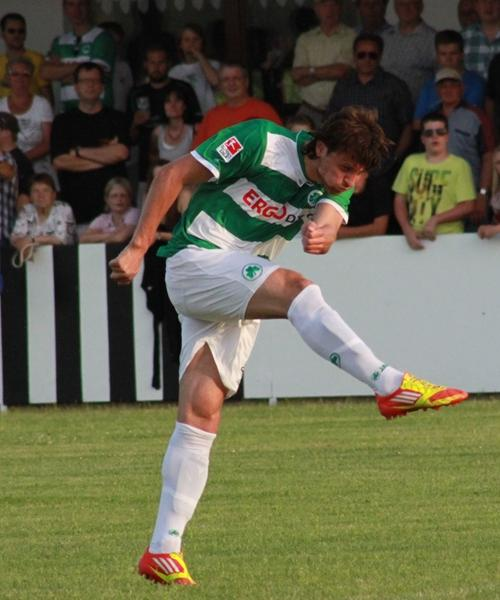
- Azemi with Greuther Fürth in 2012

Personal information
- Date of birth: 21 February 1992 (age 34)
- Place of birth: Pristina, SFR Yugoslavia
- Height: 1.91 m (6 ft 3 in)
- Position: Forward

Youth career
- –2006: Motor Gispersleben
- 2006–2011: Greuther Fürth

Senior career*
Years	Team	Apps	(Gls)
2011–2012	Greuther Fürth II	69	(25)
2012–2017	Greuther Fürth	52	(15)
2017	→ Holstein Kiel (loan)	10	(0)
2017–2018	Holstein Kiel	0	(0)
2018	Wacker Nordhausen	8	(1)
2020	SV Seligenporten	0	(0)
Total		139	(41)

International career
2014	Kosovo	1	(0)
- * Club domestic league appearances and goals

Ilir Azemi (born 21 February 1992) is a Kosovar former professional footballer who played as a forward.

== Club career ==
=== Early career ===
Azemi began his career at local side Motor Gispersleben as a child where he remained until he was spotted by Greuther Fürth scouts in 2007. He joined the Greuther Fürth youth setup in the summer of 2007, joining the under-17 squad a year later where he made 24 appearances, scoring four goals. He was then included in Jürgen Brandl's under-19 side, where he scored ten goals in 23 games, which earned him a call up to the under-23 team before the end of the 2010–11 season, where he made two appearances. The 2011–12 campaign in the under-23 squad (Greuther Fürth II) proved to be his best so far at the club, scoring 15 goals in 35 appearances, where he helped his side finish sixth and he ended the season as the Regionalliga Süd fifth top scorer.

=== Greuther Fürth ===
Following Greuther Fürth's promotion to the Bundesliga for the 2012–13 campaign. Azemi joined the senior team during pre-season where he impressed with his goal scoring ability. He finished pre-season as the top scorer of all the Bundesliga sides with 16 goals, five more than second places Vedad Ibišević of VfB Stuttgart. He managed to score six goals in a 14–0 win over amateur side TV 1912 Markt Weiltingen.

He signed a long-term contract keeping him at the club until 2015 with the option of an extension.

=== Holstein Kiel ===
On 31 January 2017. Azemi was loaned out to 3. Liga side Holstein Kiel, playing 9 matches in the second half of the season. On 1 May 2017, he signed contract with Kiel, which entered into force upon termination of contract as loan from Greuther Fürth. Having failed to make an appearance in Kiel's successful first half of the 2017–18 2. Bundesliga season, he left in January 2017 with the club placed second in the league.

=== Wacker Nordhausen ===
In January 2017, Azemi joined Regionalliga Nordost side Wacker Nordhausen.

== International career ==
The Albanian media has reported that Azemi has been called up by the Albania U21, but Azemi has declined the invitation, in that he needs time to get himself established in his club first, however he has declared that he is looking forward to becoming part of the Albania senior team in the future and that wearing the red-and-black jersey is one of his primary goals. On 8 October 2012, his club Greuther Fürth announced that he had accepted a recent call-up from the Albania U21. In January 2013, he repeated to the Albanian media that he expects a call up from manager Gianni De Biasi, to which he will respond positively in order to play for Albania. In January 2014, he confirmed his intentions.

In June 2014, Azemi reiterated his interest in playing for Albania, since he wanted to be in the field against Serbia for the UEFA Euro 2016 qualifying.

=== Kosovo ===
On 2 March 2014. Azemi received a call-up from Kosovo for the country's first FIFA-permitted match against Haiti and made his debut after being named in the starting line-up.

== Personal life ==
Azemi was born in Pristina, SFR Yugoslavia, but moved to Germany when he was just three years old, because of the Yugoslav Wars. Following the death of his father, Azemi has been providing for his mother and three sisters through his footballing income.

On 7 August 2014, he had a car crash and was heavily injured.

== Career statistics ==
As of match played 17 December 2017

Appearances and goals by club, season and competition
Club	Season	League			DFB-Pokal		Other		Total	
Club	Season	Division	Apps	Goals	Apps	Goals	Apps	Goals	Apps	Goals
Greuther Fürth II	2009–10	Regionalliga Süd	2	0	—		—		2	0
Greuther Fürth II	2010–11	Regionalliga Süd	5	0	—		—		5	0
Greuther Fürth II	2011–12	Regionalliga Süd	34	15	—		—		34	15
Greuther Fürth II	2012–13	Regionalliga Bayern	8	5	—		—		8	5
Greuther Fürth II	2015–16	Regionalliga Bayern	11	1	—		—		11	1
Greuther Fürth II	2016–17	Regionalliga Bayern	9	4	—		—		9	4
Greuther Fürth II	Total		69	25	—		0	0	69	25
Greuther Fürth	2012–13	Bundesliga	21	1	0	0	—		21	1
Greuther Fürth	2013–14	2. Bundesliga	28	14	2	0	2 (Note: Appearances in the 2. Bundesliga promotion play-offs)	0	32	14
Greuther Fürth	2014–15	2. Bundesliga	0	0	0	0	—		0	0
Greuther Fürth	2015–16	2. Bundesliga	1	0	0	0	—		1	0
Greuther Fürth	2016–17	2. Bundesliga	2	0	0	0	—		2	0
Greuther Fürth	Total		52	15	2	0	2	0	56	15
Holstein Kiel (loan)	2016–17	3. Liga	9	0	—		—		9	0
Wacker Nordhausen	2017–18	Regionalliga Nordost	0	0	—		—		0	0
Career total			121	40	2	0	2	0	125	40
