= Max Grün =

German footballer (born 1987)

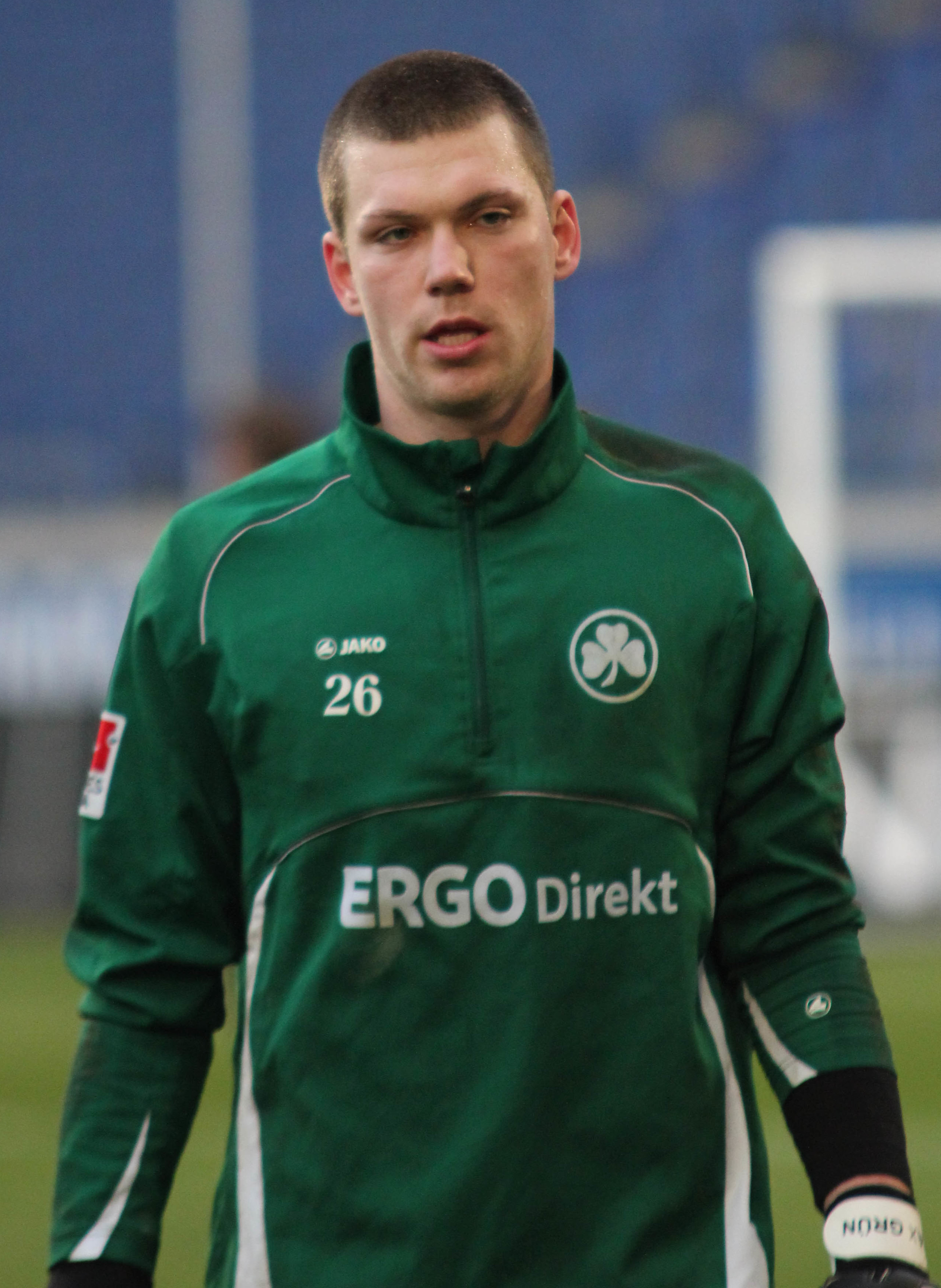
- Grün with Greuther Fürth in 2012

Personal information
- Full name: Maximilian Grün
- Date of birth: 5 April 1987 (age 39)
- Place of birth: Karlstadt, West Germany
- Height: 1.90 m (6 ft 3 in)
- Position: Goalkeeper

Team information
- Current team: Viktoria Aschaffenburg
- Number: 27

Youth career
- 1993–2002: FV Karlstadt
- 2002–2006: Bayern Munich

Senior career*
| Years | Team | Apps | (Gls) |
| 2006–2009 | Bayern Munich II | 5 | (0) |
| 2009 | Greuther Fürth II | 15 | (0) |
| 2009–2013 | Greuther Fürth | 81 | (0) |
| 2013–2018 | VfL Wolfsburg | 9 | (0) |
| 2013–2018 | VfL Wolfsburg II | 7 | (0) |
| 2018–2019 | Darmstadt 98 | 0 | (0) |
| 2019–2021 | Borussia Mönchengladbach | 0 | (0) |
| 2019–2021 | Borussia Mönchengladbach II | 3 | (0) |
| 2021– | Viktoria Aschaffenburg | 124 | (0) |

International career
| 2002–2003 | Germany U16 | 4 | (0) |
| 2003 | Germany U17 | 5 | (0) |
- * Club domestic league appearances and goals as of 1 January 2025

Maximilian "Max" Grün (born 5 April 1987) is a German professional footballer who plays as a goalkeeper for Regionalliga Bayern club Viktoria Aschaffenburg.

== Club career ==
Grün began his career with FV Karlstadt, before in summer 2002, he was scouted by Bayern Munich. After three years in Bayern's youth setup, he was promoted to the reserve team, where he served as the backup goalkeeper for four years, behind Michael Rensing and later Thomas Kraft.

After seven years with Bayern Munich, he left the team to sign a one-year contract with SpVgg Greuther Fürth on 5 August 2009. He recorded consistent performances throughout the 2009–10 season and became the starting goalkeeper for the team. In March 2010, he extended his contraxt with Greuther Fürth by four years until 2014. At the end of the 2011–12 season, the club won the 2. Bundesliga and promoted to the Bundesliga. However, during the season, Grün was replaced as starter by Wolfgang Hesl.

On 31 May 2013, Grün signed a three-year contract with Bundesliga club VfL Wolfsburg to become the backup to starter Diego Benaglio, after the departure of Marwin Hitz. He made his Bundesliga debut for Wolfsburg on 25 March 2014 in a 3–1 away win against Werder Bremen, coming on as a substitute for the injured Benaglio in the second half. In 2015, he won the DFB-Pokal with Wolfsburg and finished runner-up in the Bundesliga.

Grün left Wolfsburg when his contract expired in June 2018 and joined 2. Bundesliga club Darmstadt 98 on 3 September 2018. There he did not make an appearance during the season, backing up Daniel Heuer Fernandes.

On 31 May 2017, Grün moved to Bundesliga club Borussia Mönchengladbach, which he left after two seasons in which he had only played three league games for the second team.

Grün moved to Regionalliga Bayern club Viktoria Aschaffenburg on 16 June 2021, signing a two-year contract. He made his debut on the opening matchday in a 1–0 away defeat against FV Illertissen. Grün is also goalkeeping coach for the Aschaffenburg U19 team.

== International career ==
Grün made his first international appearance for the Germany U16 team on 20 October 2002 in Eschweiler where the side won 2–1 against Wales U16. Three more caps followed in 2003 before he made his debut for the Germany U17 team on 30 September 2003 in a 0–0 draw against Belgium U17 in Amel. In 2003, he made four more appearances for the U17s.

== Career statistics ==
As of match played on 27 May 2025

Appearances and goals by club, season and competition
| Club | Season | League | | | Cup | | Europe | | Other | | Total | |
| Club | Season | Division | Apps | Goals | Apps | Goals | Apps | Goals | Apps | Goals | Apps | Goals |
|---|---|---|---|---|---|---|---|---|---|---|---|---|
| Bayern Munich II | 2006–07 | Regionalliga Süd | 1 | 0 | — | | — | | — | | 1 | 0 |
| Bayern Munich II | 2007–08 | Regionalliga Süd | 1 | 0 | — | | — | | — | | 1 | 0 |
| Bayern Munich II | 2008–09 | 3. Liga | 3 | 0 | — | | — | | — | | 3 | 0 |
| Bayern Munich II | 2009–10 | 3. Liga | 0 | 0 | — | | — | | — | | 3 | 0 |
| Bayern Munich II | Total | | 5 | 0 | — | | — | | — | | 5 | 0 |
| Greuther Fürth II | 2009–10 | Regionalliga Süd | 15 | 0 | — | | — | | — | | 15 | 0 |
| Greuther Fürth | 2009–10 | 2. Bundesliga | 13 | 0 | 0 | 0 | — | | — | | 13 | 0 |
| Greuther Fürth | 2010–11 | 2. Bundesliga | 17 | 0 | 2 | 0 | — | | — | | 19 | 0 |
| Greuther Fürth | 2011–12 | 2. Bundesliga | 34 | 0 | 5 | 0 | — | | — | | 39 | 0 |
| Greuther Fürth | 2012–13 | Bundesliga | 17 | 0 | 1 | 0 | — | | — | | 18 | 0 |
| Greuther Fürth | Total | | 81 | 0 | 8 | 0 | — | | — | | 89 | 0 |
| VfL Wolfsburg | 2013–14 | Bundesliga | 6 | 0 | 1 | 0 | — | | — | | 7 | 0 |
| VfL Wolfsburg | 2014–15 | Bundesliga | 3 | 0 | 1 | 0 | 0 | 0 | — | | 4 | 0 |
| VfL Wolfsburg | 2015–16 | Bundesliga | 0 | 0 | 0 | 0 | 0 | 0 | 0 | 0 | 0 | 0 |
| VfL Wolfsburg | 2016–17 | Bundesliga | 0 | 0 | 0 | 0 | — | | 0 | 0 | 0 | 0 |
| VfL Wolfsburg | 2017–18 | Bundesliga | 0 | 0 | 1 | 0 | — | | 0 | 0 | 1 | 0 |
| VfL Wolfsburg | Total | | 9 | 0 | 3 | 0 | 0 | 0 | 0 | 0 | 12 | 0 |
| VfL Wolfsburg II | 2015–16 | Regionalliga Nord | 2 | 0 | — | | — | | — | | 2 | 0 |
| VfL Wolfsburg II | 2016–17 | Regionalliga Nord | 5 | 0 | — | | — | | — | | 5 | 0 |
| VfL Wolfsburg II | Total | | 7 | 0 | — | | — | | — | | 7 | 0 |
| Darmstadt 98 | 2018–19 | 2. Bundesliga | 0 | 0 | 0 | 0 | — | | — | | 0 | 0 |
| Borussia Mönchengladbach | 2019–20 | Bundesliga | 0 | 0 | 0 | 0 | 0 | 0 | — | | 0 | 0 |
| Borussia Mönchengladbach | 2020–21 | Bundesliga | 0 | 0 | 0 | 0 | 0 | 0 | — | | 0 | 0 |
| Borussia Mönchengladbach | Total | | 0 | 0 | 0 | 0 | 0 | 0 | — | | 0 | 0 |
| Borussia Mönchengladbach II | 2019–20 | Regionalliga West | 3 | 0 | — | | — | | — | | 3 | 0 |
| Viktoria Aschaffenburg | 2021–22 | Regionalliga Bayern | 36 | 0 | — | | — | | — | | 36 | 0 |
| Viktoria Aschaffenburg | 2022–23 | Regionalliga Bayern | 34 | 0 | — | | — | | — | | 34 | 0 |
| Viktoria Aschaffenburg | 2023–24 | Regionalliga Bayern | 32 | 0 | — | | — | | — | | 32 | 0 |
| Viktoria Aschaffenburg | 2024–25 | Regionalliga Bayern | 33 | 0 | — | | — | | 4 | 0 | 37 | 0 |
| Viktoria Aschaffenburg | Total | | 135 | 0 | — | | — | | 2 | 0 | 139 | 0 |
| Career total | | | 255 | 0 | 11 | 0 | 0 | 0 | 4 | 0 | 270 | 0 |

== Honours ==
Greuther Fürth

- 2. Bundesliga: 2011–12

VfL Wolfsburg

- DFB-Pokal: 2014–15
- DFL-Supercup: 2015
