= Johannes Geis =

German footballer

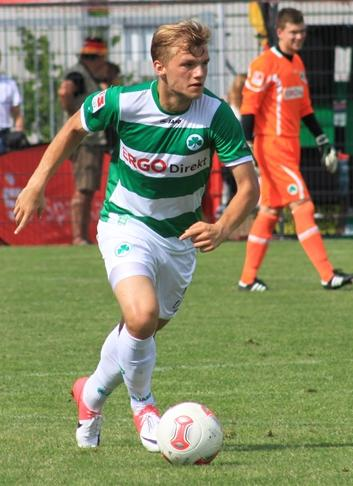
- Geis playing for Greuther Fürth in 2012

Personal information
- Date of birth: 17 August 1993 (age 33)
- Place of birth: Schweinfurt, Germany
- Height: 1.81 m (5 ft 11 in)
- Position: Defensive midfielder

Team information
- Current team: 1. FC Schweinfurt 05
- Number: 30

Youth career
- TSV Oberstreu
- TSV Mittelstreu
- 2004–2008: TSV Großbardorf
- 2008–2012: Greuther Fürth

Senior career*
Years	Team	Apps	(Gls)
2010–2013	Greuther Fürth	17	(1)
2011–2013	Greuther Fürth II	28	(4)
2013–2015	Mainz 05	67	(5)
2015–2018	Schalke 04	46	(2)
2017–2018	→ Sevilla (loan)	14	(0)
2019	1. FC Köln	14	(0)
2019–2024	1. FC Nürnberg	132	(11)
2024–2025	SpVgg Unterhaching	24	(1)
2025–	1. FC Schweinfurt 05	35	(5)

International career
2008–2009	Germany U16	11	(3)
2009–2010	Germany U17	12	(1)
2010–2011	Germany U18	6	(1)
2011–2012	Germany U19	8	(0)
2012–2013	Germany U20	2	(0)
2013–2015	Germany U21	12	(0)
- * Club domestic league appearances and goals as of 30 May 2026

Johannes Geis (German pronunciation: [joˈhanəs ˈɡaɪs]; born 17 August 1993) is a German professional footballer who plays as a defensive midfielder for 3. Liga club 1. FC Schweinfurt 05.

== Club career ==
=== Early career ===
Geis made his Bundesliga debut for 1. FSV Mainz 05 at 11 August 2013 in a 3–2 home win against VfB Stuttgart. On 17 August 2013, he provided an assist to Niki Zimling's opening goal in a 1–2 away win against SC Freiburg.

=== Schalke 04 ===
On 23 June 2015, Geis joined FC Schalke 04 on a four-year deal for a fee in the region of €12 million.

On 8 August, he marked his competitive debut by scoring in a 5–0 win at MSV Duisburg in the first round of the DFB-Pokal.

Geis was sent off for a horrible studs-up challenge on André Hahn in a 3–1 defeat to Borussia Mönchengladbach on 25 October which resulted in a five-match ban for Geis, and left Hahn requiring surgery for a fractured tibia and a lateral meniscus tear. However, Geis was still allowed to play Europa League matches, in which he equalized from the penalty spot against Sparta Prague on 5 November in a 1–1 draw.

=== Sevilla ===
On 1 September 2017, Geis joined Spanish club Sevilla on a season-long loan deal, which includes a buyout option for €8 million.

=== 1. FC Köln ===
On 13 January 2019, Geis signed a contract with 1. FC Köln until the end of the season. In spite of a moderately successful time at Köln, the club announced that they would not offer him a contract extension, making him a free agent from July. He left the club at the end of the season.

=== 1. FC Nürnberg ===
On 23 July 2024, the contract between Geis and 1. FC Nürnberg was terminated by mutual consent after 5 seasons at the club.

=== SpVgg Unterhaching ===
On 18 October 2024, Geis joined 3. Liga club SpVgg Unterhaching.

=== 1. FC Schweinfurt 05 ===
After Unterhaching was relegated from 3. Liga, on 17 June 2025 Geis signed for 1. FC Schweinfurt 05, that was promoted to 3. Liga as champion of tier-four Regionalliga Bayern.

== International career ==
Geis made his debut for Germany U21 against France U21 on 13 August 2013 in a friendly game in Freiburg im Breisgau. He replaced Emre Can at half-time.

He represented the under-21 team at the 2015 European Championship in the Czech Republic, starting 1 match and coming on as a substitute in another. Geis made a substitute appearance, coming on for Can in the 77th minute, in their second group match at the Eden Arena in Prague against Denmark, in a 3–0 victory.

== Career statistics ==
As of 30 July 2023

Club	Season	League			Cup		Europe		Total	
Club	Season	League	Apps	Goals	Apps	Goals	Apps	Goals	Apps	Goals
Greuther Fürth	2010–11	2. Bundesliga	6	0	0	0	—		6	0
Greuther Fürth	2011–12	2. Bundesliga	3	0	0	0	—		3	0
Greuther Fürth	2012–13	Bundesliga	8	1	0	0	—		8	1
Greuther Fürth	Total		17	1	0	0	0	0	17	1
Greuther Fürth II	2011–12	Regionalliga Süd	17	2	—		—		17	2
Greuther Fürth II	2012–13	Regionalliga Bayern	12	2	—		—		12	2
Greuther Fürth II	Total		29	4	—		—		29	4
Mainz 05	2013–14	Bundesliga	33	1	1	0	—		34	1
Mainz 05	2014–15	Bundesliga	34	4	1	1	2	0	37	5
Mainz 05	Total		67	5	2	1	2	0	71	6
Schalke 04	2015–16	Bundesliga	28	2	1	1	8	1	37	4
Schalke 04	2016–17	Bundesliga	18	0	1	1	5	0	24	1
Schalke 04	2018–19	Bundesliga	0	0	0	0	0	0	0	0
Schalke 04	Total		46	2	2	2	13	1	61	5
Sevilla (loan)	2017–18	La Liga	14	0	4	0	2	0	20	0
Schalke 04 II	2018–19	Oberliga Westfalen	1	0	—		—		1	0
1. FC Köln	2018–19	2. Bundesliga	14	0	0	0	—		14	0
1. FC Nürnberg	2019–20	2. Bundesliga	29	5	2	0	—		31	5
1. FC Nürnberg	2020–21	2. Bundesliga	34	3	1	0	—		35	3
1. FC Nürnberg	2021–22	2. Bundesliga	27	3	2	0	—		29	3
1. FC Nürnberg	2022–23	2. Bundesliga	30	0	4	1	—		34	1
1. FC Nürnberg	2023–24	2. Bundesliga	1	0	0	0	—		1	0
1. FC Nürnberg	Total		121	11	9	1	0	0	130	12
Career total			307	23	17	4	17	1	341	28
