= Stefan Kolb =

German footballer

Personal information
- Full name: Stefan Kolb
- Date of birth: 22 January 1991 (age 35)
- Place of birth: Bayreuth, Germany
- Height: 1.85 m (6 ft 1 in)
- Position: Striker

Team information
- Current team: TSV Neudrossenfeld
- Number: 10

Youth career
- 1996–2001: Sportring Bayreuth
- 2001–2007: FSV Bayreuth
- 2007–2009: FC Carl Zeiss Jena

Senior career*
Years	Team	Apps	(Gls)
2009–2010	FC Carl Zeiss Jena	15	(1)
2010–2012	Greuther Fürth II	37	(5)
2012–2016	SpVgg Bayreuth	77	(26)
2016–	TSV Neudrossenfeld	89	(51)
- * Club domestic league appearances and goals as of 23 January 2021

Stefan Kolb (born 22 January 1991) is a German football striker who plays for TSV Neudrossenfeld.

== Career ==
Kolb began his career with Sportring Bayreuth before he moved to FSV Bayreuth in summer 2001. After six years playing for FSV Bayreuth's youth team he left for FC Carl Zeiss Jena in summer 2007. After 23 games in two years he was promoted to the 3. Liga team and made his debut on 29 August 2009 against VfL Osnabrück and scored his first goal on 5 September 2009 against Holstein Kiel which was the deciding one. After four years with Carl Zeiss Jena and his first professional season he signed on 3 July 2010 with Greuther Fürth.
