= Heinrich Schmidtgal =

Kazakhstani footballer

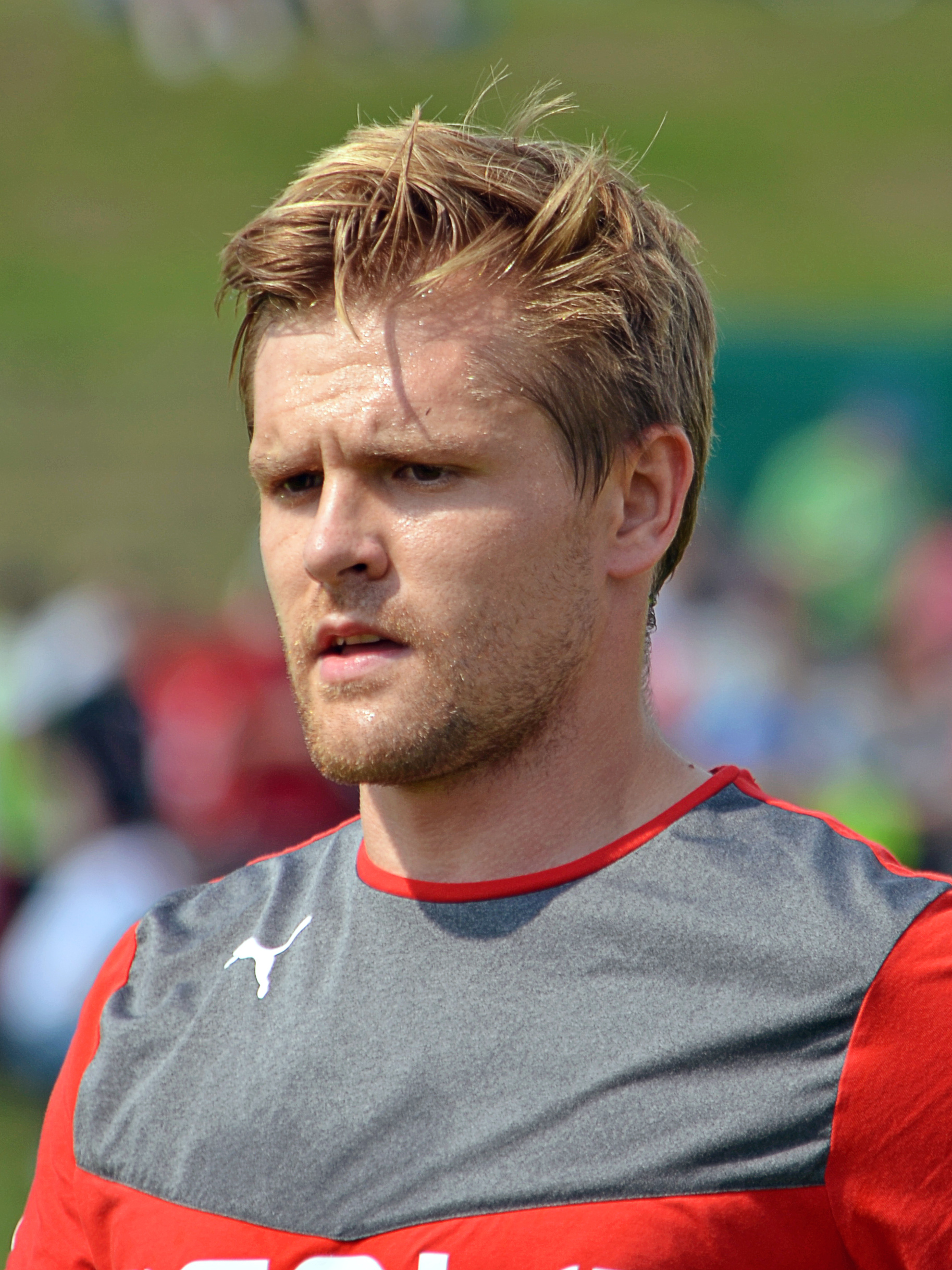
- Schmidtgal in 2014

Personal information
- Full name: Heinrich Schmidtgal
- Date of birth: 20 November 1985 (age 40)
- Place of birth: Esik, Kazakh SSR, Soviet Union
- Height: 1.74 m (5 ft 9 in)
- Position: Left-back

Youth career
- FC Hövelriege
- –2004: SC Verl

Senior career*
Years	Team	Apps	(Gls)
2003–2007	SC Verl	102	(15)
2007–2009	VfL Bochum	0	(0)
2007–2009	→ VfL Bochum II	61	(8)
2009–2011	Rot-Weiß Oberhausen	51	(5)
2011–2013	Greuther Fürth	44	(4)
2013–2015	Fortuna Düsseldorf	18	(0)
2015–2016	FSV Frankfurt	0	(0)
Total		276	(32)

International career
2010–2015	Kazakhstan	14	(1)
- * Club domestic league appearances and goals

Heinrich Schmidtgal (Kazakh: Генрих Шмидтгаль, Genrih Şmidtgal; born 20 November 1985) is a Kazakhstani former professional footballer who played as a left-back.

== Early life ==
Born in Esik, Kazakh SSR, Schmidtgal emigrated with his parents at the age of two from the former Soviet Union and settled in Schloss Holte-Stukenbrock in East Westphalia in North Rhine-Westphalia.

== Club career ==
=== Early career ===
Schmidtgal started to play football at FC Hövelriege and move from there to the youth of SC Verl. On 27 August 2003, the second matchday of the Oberliga Westfalen, he made his debut for the first team in the 3–2 defeat against FC Gütersloh. In this season, where he was still a youth player, he came to a total of ten appearances. In the next season, he achieved a place in the starting eleven and came to 29 appearances. He showed above average performance and thus aroused the interest from clubs in higher leagues, among those VfL Bochum who signed him. Schmidtgal had previously contributed to Verl's promotion to the Regionalliga, the then third division.

=== VfL Bochum ===
In Bochum, he played for the second team and did only train with the first team, which was playing in the Bundesliga.

=== Rot-Weiß Oberhausen ===
In summer of 2009, Schmidtgal left VfL Bochum and signed for Rot-Weiß Oberhausen the 2. Bundesliga.

=== Greuther Fürth ===
For the 2011–12 season he joined SpVgg Greuther Fürth with a two-year contract.

=== Fortuna Düsseldorf ===
In 2013, Schmidtgal moved on to Fortuna Düsseldorf.

=== FSV Frankfurt ===
In June 2015 he signed a two-year contract with FSV Frankfurt.

Schmidtgal retired from playing in 2016 due to cartilage damage.

== International career ==
In 2008 Bernd Storck, the newly appointed manager of the Kazakhstan national team, researched German players born in Kazakhstan. This research revealed Sergei Karimov, Juri Judt, Konstantin Engel and Heinrich Schmidtgal. On 3 September 2010, Schmidtgal made his debut for the Kazakhstan national team in a Euro 2012 qualifier against Turkey. Schmidtgal was not entitled by UEFA rules to play for the Kazakhstan national team in second qualifier game against Austria in Vienna, as Schmidtgal had not yet completed obtaining Kazakhstani citizenship and was only in possession of preliminary id (a provisional document not valid outside Kazakhstan). This issue was later resolved by Schmidtgal gaining dual citizenship (German-Kazakhstani).

During his 12th appearance for the Kazakhstan, Schmidtgal scored his first international goal in a 4–1 loss against Germany during the group stage of 2014 FIFA World Cup qualification. That match took place in Nuremberg, which has become contiguous with Fürth, where he played his club football at the time.

=== International goal ===
Scores and results list Kazakhstan's goal tally first, score column indicates score after Schmidtgal goal.

International goal scored by Heinrich Schmidtgal
No.	Date	Venue	Opponent	Score	Result	Competition
1	26 March 2013	Frankenstadion, Nuremberg, Germany	Germany	1–3	1–4	2014 World Cup qualifier
