= Thomas Kleine =

German footballer (born 1977)

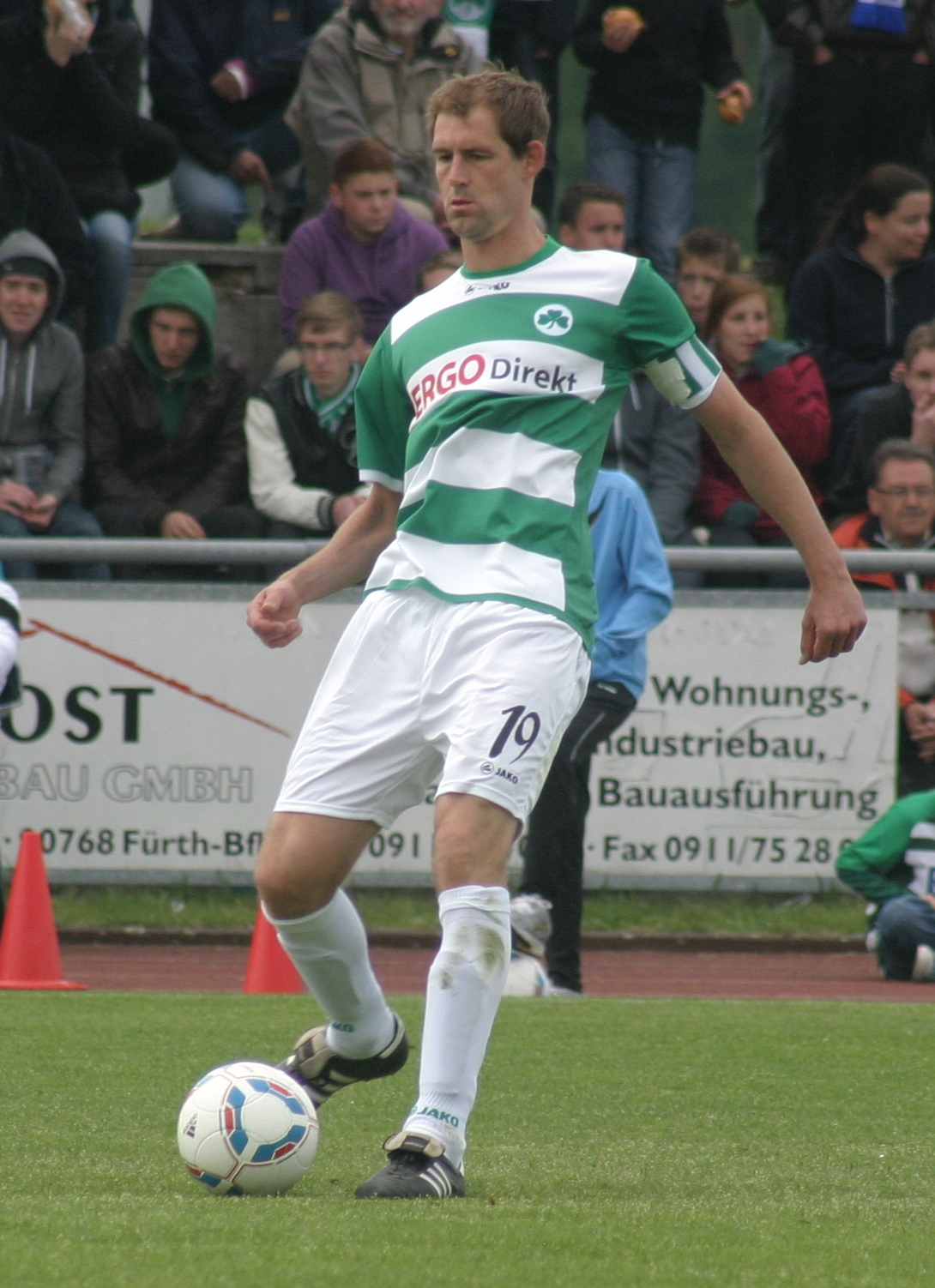
- Kleine with Greuther Fürth in 2012

Personal information
- Date of birth: 28 December 1977 (age 48)
- Place of birth: Wermelskirchen, West Germany
- Height: 1.91 m (6 ft 3 in)
- Position: Defender

Youth career
- –1998: SV 09/35 Wermelskirchen

Senior career*
Years	Team	Apps	(Gls)
1998–2003	Bayer Leverkusen II	95	(6)
2001–2003	Bayer Leverkusen	10	(0)
2003–2007	Greuther Fürth	131	(13)
2007	Hannover 96 II	2	(0)
2007	Hannover 96	9	(1)
2008–2010	Borussia Mönchengladbach	30	(3)
2010–2014	Greuther Fürth	105	(2)
2014–2015	Greuther Fürth II	15	(0)
Total		397	(25)

International career
2003	Germany Team 2006	1	(0)

Managerial career
- 2015: Greuther Fürth II (caretaker)
- 2015–2022: Greuther Fürth II
- 2022–2023: SpVgg Bayreuth
- 2025: Greuther Fürth
- * Club domestic league appearances and goals

Thomas Kleine (born 28 December 1977) is a German football manager and former player. He most recently managed Greuther Fürth.

== Career ==
Born in Wermelskirchen, Kleine began his career in the youth ranks of his hometown club SV 09 Wermelskirchen where he remained until 1998, when he moved to Bayer 04 Leverkusen's amateur ranks.

He played regularly with the amateurs in the lower league structures, but was unable to push his way into the full squad until the 2001–02 season. He finally made his Bundesliga debut on 19 December 2001 in a 3–1 defeat at VfL Wolfsburg.

Later that season he made further progress, managing six more Bundesliga appearances and, perhaps more significantly, seven games in their Champions League campaign, facing the likes of Barcelona and Manchester United. The club eventually achieved the honour of runners-ups, although Kleine himself did not compete beyond the second group stage. The team also finished runners-up in both the league and cup.

Following this season, Kleine left for 2. Bundesliga team SpVgg Greuther Fürth, looking to become a first team regular. He was a virtual ever-present in his four seasons with the club, amassing 131 appearances and catching the eye of Bundesliga club Hannover 96, especially with nine goals in his final season. On 13 February 2007, he agreed to join Hannover 96 from the 2007–08 season onward.

In January 2008, Kleine moved to Borussia Mönchengladbach for a fee of €700,000. He returned to his former club SpVgg Greuther Fürth on 1 July 2010.

After coaching several years the second team in Fürth and being an as assistant in Düsseldorf, he was as the appointed head coach of SpVgg Bayreuth. He was sacked in May 2023.

In May 2025, he was named interim manager of Greuther Fürth. Later that month, he was promoted to be the permanent coach. He was sacked by the club on 1 December 2025.
