= Tayfun Pektürk =

German-Turkish footballer

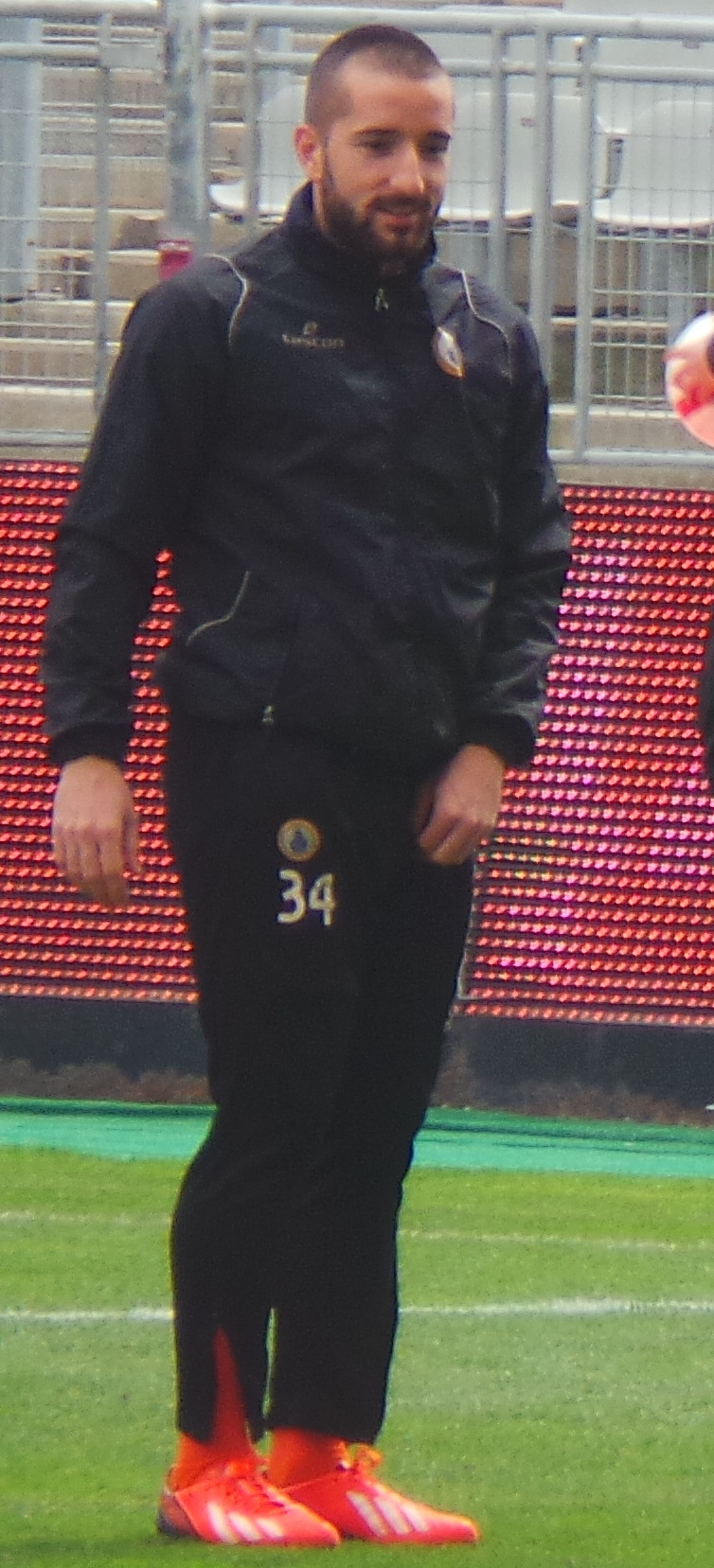
- Pektürk in 2014

Personal information
- Date of birth: 13 May 1988 (age 38)
- Place of birth: Wermelskirchen, West Germany
- Height: 1.77 m (5 ft 10 in)
- Positions: Midfielder; forward

Team information
- Current team: Borussia Freialdenhoven
- Number: 7

Youth career
- 1994–2001: SV Wermelskirchen
- 2001–2002: Bayer Leverkusen
- 2002–2004: SV Wermelskirchen
- 2004–2005: Wuppertaler SV Borussia
- 2005–2007: Schalke 04

Senior career*
Years	Team	Apps	(Gls)
2007–2009	TuS Koblenz	29	(2)
2009–2010	Eintracht Trier	10	(2)
2010–2012	Greuther Fürth	39	(1)
2013–2015	İstanbul Başakşehir	40	(5)
2015–2018	Karşıyaka	73	(7)
2018–2019	Utaş Uşakspor	27	(3)
2019–2020	İnegölspor	21	(4)
2020–2023	SV Eintracht Hohkeppel	39	(10)
2023–	Borussia Freialdenhoven	8	(3)
- * Club domestic league appearances and goals as of 30 September 2023

Tayfun Pektürk (born 13 May 1988) is a German-Turkish professional footballer who plays as a midfielder or forward for Mittelrheinliga club Borussia Freialdenhoven.

== Career ==
Born in Wermelskirchen, Pektürk began his career in 1994 with SV Wermelskirchen. In 2004, he signed for third division side Wuppertaler SV Borussia. He played one year for Wuppertal, before signing for FC Schalke 04 in July 2005.

Pektürk made his debut at the professional level in the 2. Bundesliga for TuS Koblenz on 23 September 2007, when he started the game against 1. FC Köln. On 17 September 2009, he signed for Eintracht Trier, but was demoted into the reserve team in February 2010. On 6 April 2010, Pektürk announced he would leave Eintracht Trier at the end of the season and join SpVgg Greuther Fürth on 1 July 2010.
