= Bernd Nehrig =

German footballer (born 1986)

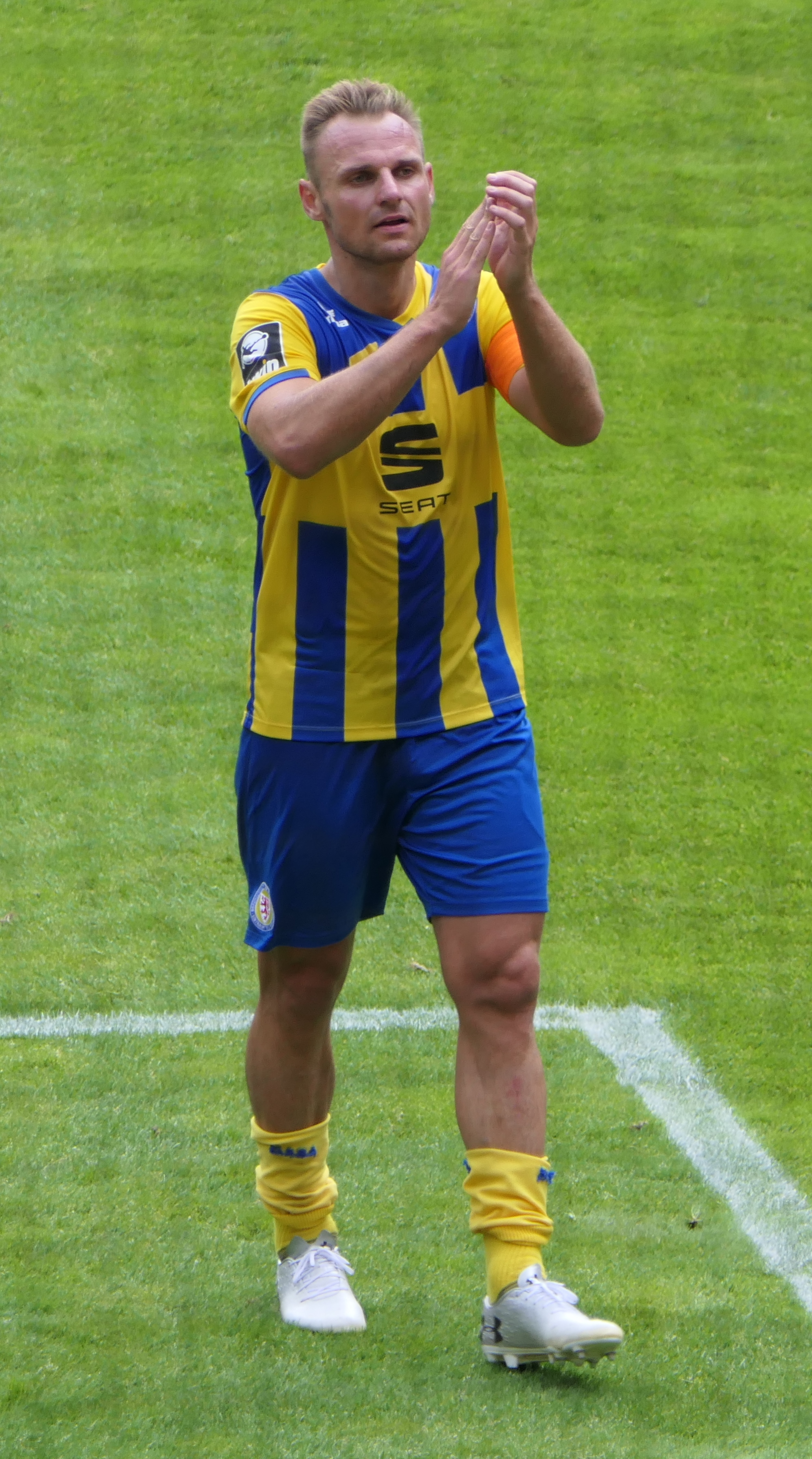
- Nehrig playing for Eintracht Braunschweig in 2019

Personal information
- Date of birth: 28 September 1986 (age 40)
- Place of birth: Heidenheim an der Brenz, West Germany
- Height: 1.82 m (6 ft 0 in)
- Positions: Right-back; midfielder

Youth career
- 1990–1998: TV Steinheim
- 1998–2005: VfB Stuttgart

Senior career*
Years	Team	Apps	(Gls)
2005–2007	VfB Stuttgart II	39	(18)
2006–2007	VfB Stuttgart	1	(0)
2007	→ SpVgg Unterhaching (loan)	3	(0)
2007–2013	Greuther Fürth	170	(29)
2010	→ Greuther Fürth II	1	(0)
2013–2019	FC St. Pauli	111	(4)
2014–2015	→ FC St. Pauli II	3	(0)
2019–2020	Eintracht Braunschweig	32	(1)
2020–2022	Viktoria Berlin	3	(0)

International career
2001–2002	Germany U16	10	(2)
2004	Germany U19	2	(0)
2006–2007	Germany U20	4	(0)
2007	Germany U21	1	(0)
- * Club domestic league appearances and goals

Bernd Nehrig (born 28 September 1986) is a German former professional footballer who played as a right-back.
