= Robert Zillner =

German footballer

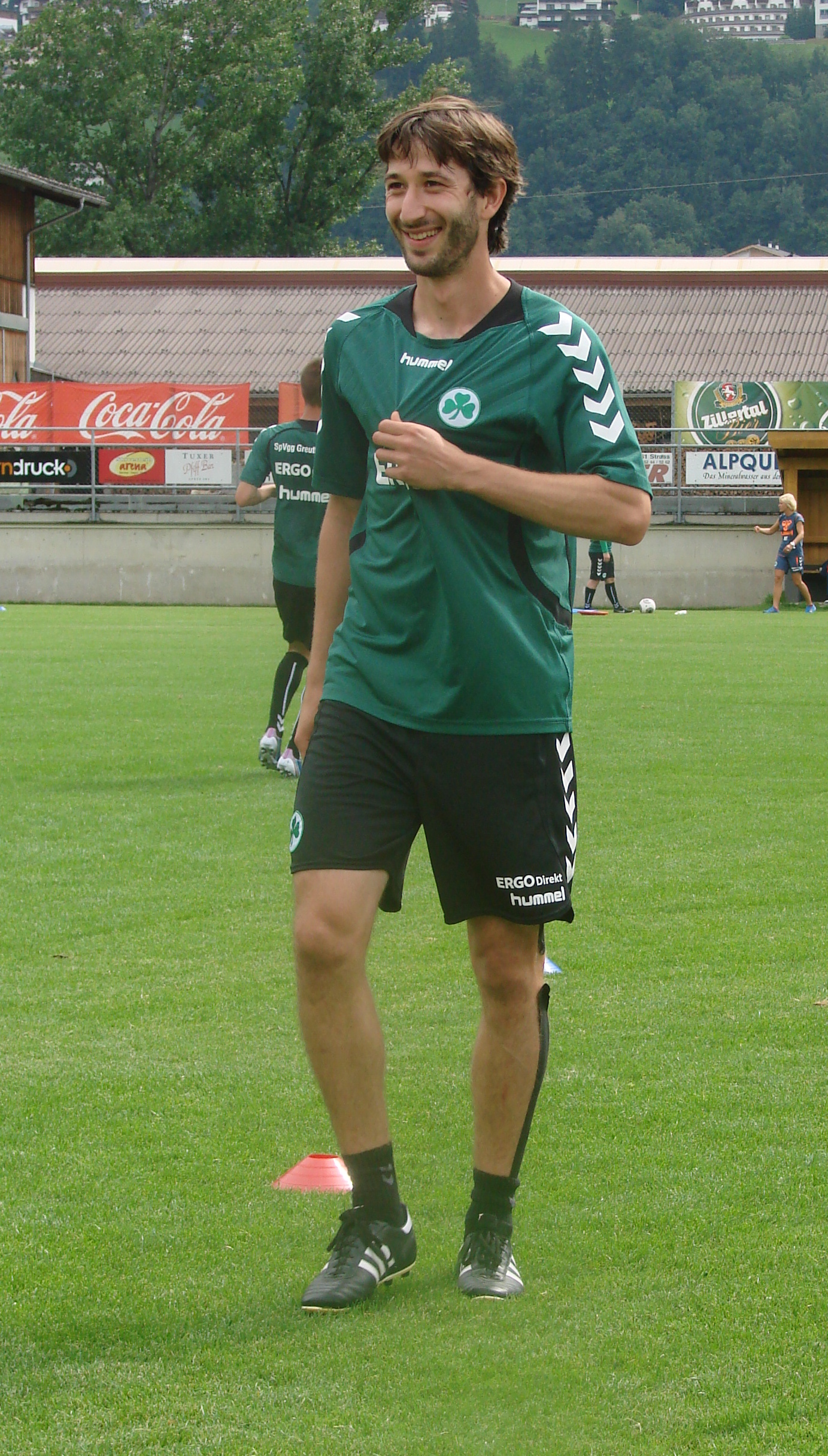

Personal information
- Date of birth: 4 August 1985 (age 41)
- Place of birth: Passau, West Germany
- Height: 1.83 m (6 ft 0 in)
- Position: Left winger

Team information
- Current team: FC Sturm Hauzenberg

Youth career
- TSV Waldkirchen

Senior career*
Years	Team	Apps	(Gls)
2006–2008	SpVgg Unterhaching II	26	(2)
2007–2011	SpVgg Unterhaching	102	(15)
2011–2014	Greuther Fürth II	16	(0)
2011–2014	Greuther Fürth	21	(1)
2014–2016	SV Sandhausen	24	(1)
2016–2017	SV Schalding-Heining	20	(3)
2017–	FC Sturm Hauzenberg	20	(1)
- * Club domestic league appearances and goals as of 14 June 2018

Robert Zillner (born 4 August 1985) is a German former footballer who played as a left winger. He most recently played for SV Schalding-Heining.
