= Christopher Nöthe =

German footballer (born 1988)

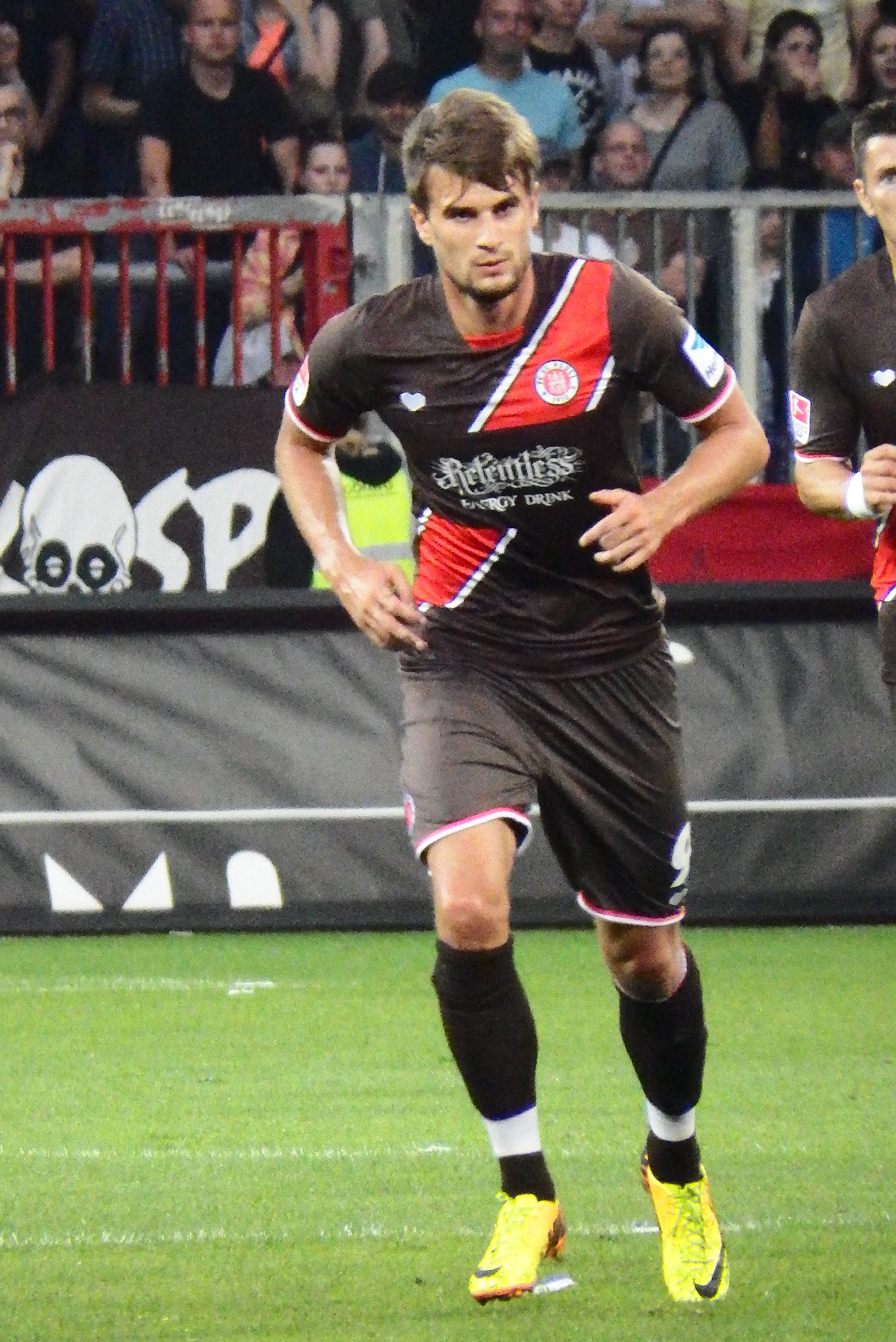
- Nöthe playing for FC St. Pauli in 2013

Personal information
- Date of birth: 3 January 1988 (age 38)
- Place of birth: Castrop-Rauxel, West Germany
- Height: 1.84 m (6 ft 0 in)
- Position: Forward

Youth career
- 1994–2000: VfR Rauxel
- 2000–2001: FC Schalke 04
- 2001–2003: VfL Bochum
- 2003–2007: Borussia Dortmund

Senior career*
Years	Team	Apps	(Gls)
2006–2009	Borussia Dortmund II	33	(9)
2007–2009	Borussia Dortmund	3	(0)
2008–2009	→ Rot-Weiß Oberhausen (loan)	14	(5)
2009–2013	Greuther Fürth	86	(30)
2013–2015	FC St. Pauli	50	(10)
2013	FC St. Pauli II	1	(1)
2015–2019	Arminia Bielefeld	44	(8)
Total		231	(63)

International career
2009	Germany U-20	1	(0)
- * Club domestic league appearances and goals

Christopher Nöthe (born 3 January 1988) is a German professional footballer who played as a forward.

== Career ==
Born in Castrop-Rauxel, North Rhine-Westphalia, Nöthe made his debut on the professional league level in the Bundesliga for Borussia Dortmund on 29 September 2007 coming on as a substitute in the 74th minute in a game against Karlsruher SC. He started in the next game, but was substituted and only played in one more league game for Borussia that season.

He represented Germany at the youth level once in 2009, in a 6–0 win over San Marino national under-21 football team.

Nöthe retired from playing in summer 2019, due to injury problems and upon expiration of his contract at Arminia Bielefeld.

== Honours ==
- DFB-Pokal finalist: 2007–08
