= Milorad Peković =

Montenegrin footballer

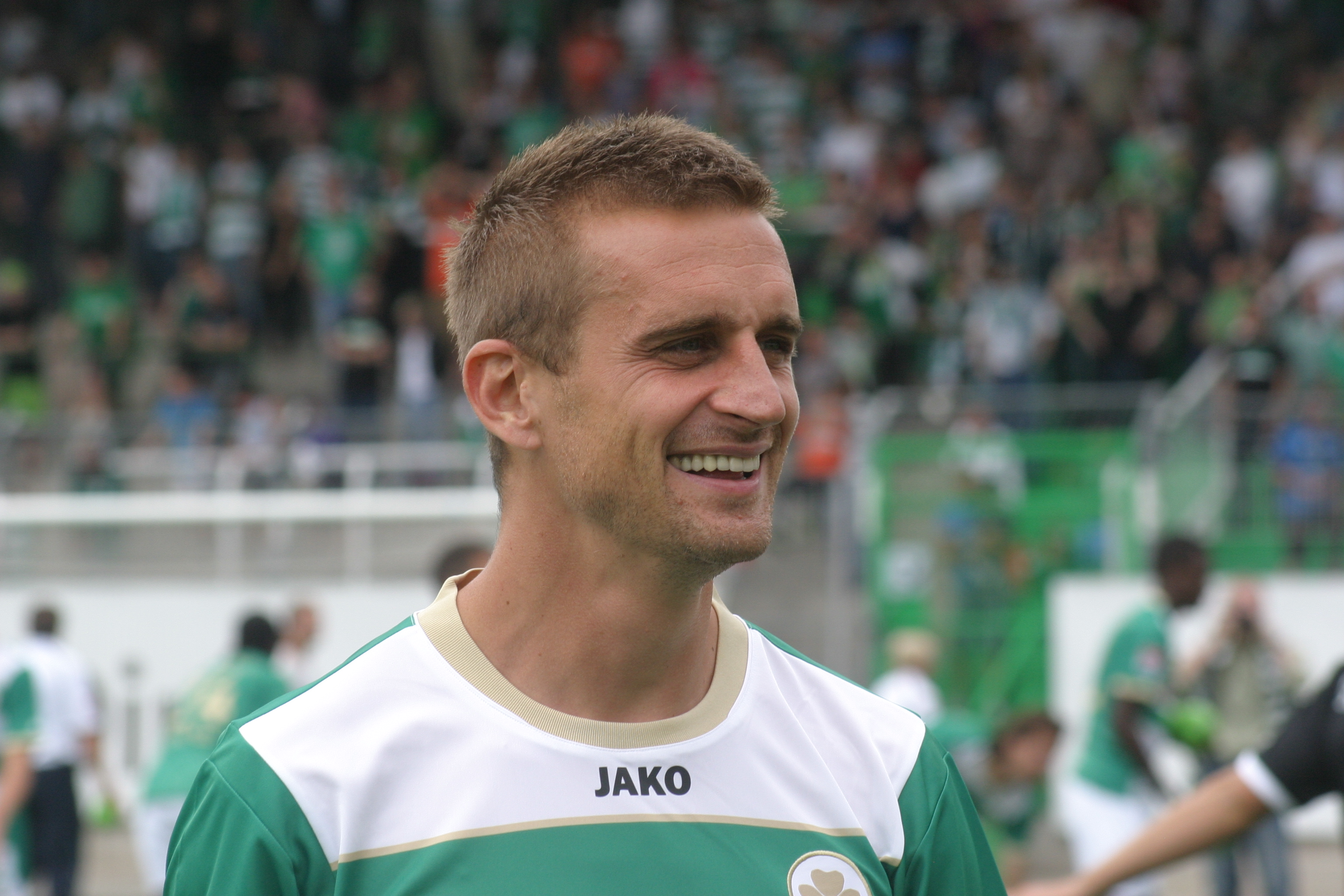
- Peković in 2012

Personal information
- Date of birth: 5 August 1977 (age 49)
- Place of birth: Nikšić, SR Montenegro, SFR Yugoslavia
- Height: 1.89 m (6 ft 2 in)
- Position: Midfielder

Youth career
- 1987–1992: Obilić
- 1992–1994: OFK Beograd

Senior career*
Years	Team	Apps	(Gls)
1994–1999	OFK Beograd	77	(9)
1999–2001	Partizan	40	(3)
2001–2002	OFK Beograd	26	(3)
2002–2005	Eintracht Trier	84	(11)
2005–2010	Mainz 05	122	(1)
2010–2013	Greuther Fürth	76	(1)
2013–2014	Hansa Rostock	24	(1)
2014–2015	Eintracht Trier	23	(2)
Total		472	(31)

International career
2007–2013	Montenegro	34	(0)

Managerial career
- 2018–2020: Montenegro U19
- 2020–2021: FK Podgorica
- 2023–2025: Dečić
- 2025: Greuther Fürth
- * Club domestic league appearances and goals

Milorad Peković (Serbian Cyrillic: Милорад Пековић; born 5 August 1977) is a Montenegrin former professional footballer who played as a midfielder. He spent most of his club career in Germany and represented the Montenegro national team at international level.

== Club career ==
Born in Nikšić, SR Montenegro, SFR Yugoslavia (now Montenegro), he grew up in Serbia where he moved to as a young boy and started playing football within FK Obilić's youth ranks in 1987. Significant were the two seasons he played for Serbian giants Partizan having played 54 games for the club and scoring 5 goals. Before finally coming to Germany he spent one season in another Belgrade club, the OFK Beograd where he had already been playing between 1994 and 1999. His most successful spell was with 1. FSV Mainz 05, with whom he spent five seasons. In 2010, he joined SpVgg Greuther Fürth, with whom he played for two seasons including one in the Bundesliga. In May 2013 he signed for FC Hansa Rostock before returning to former club Eintracht Trier a year later.

== International career ==
Peković made his debut for Montenegro in a September 2007 friendly match against Sweden and has earned a total of 34 caps, scoring no goals. His final international was an August 2013 friendly against Belarus.

== Career statistics ==
=== International ===
Appearances and goals by national team and year
National team	Year	Apps	Goals
Montenegro	2007	2	0
Montenegro	2008	5	0
Montenegro	2009	7	0
Montenegro	2010	8	0
Montenegro	2011	5	0
Montenegro	2012	4	0
Montenegro	2013	3	0
Total		34	0

== Honours ==
=== Player ===
Partizan

- FR Yugoslavia Cup: 2001

Greuther Fürth

- 2. Bundesliga: 2011–12

=== Manager ===
Dečić

- Montenegrin First League: 2023–24
