= Sercan Sararer =

Footballer (born 1989)

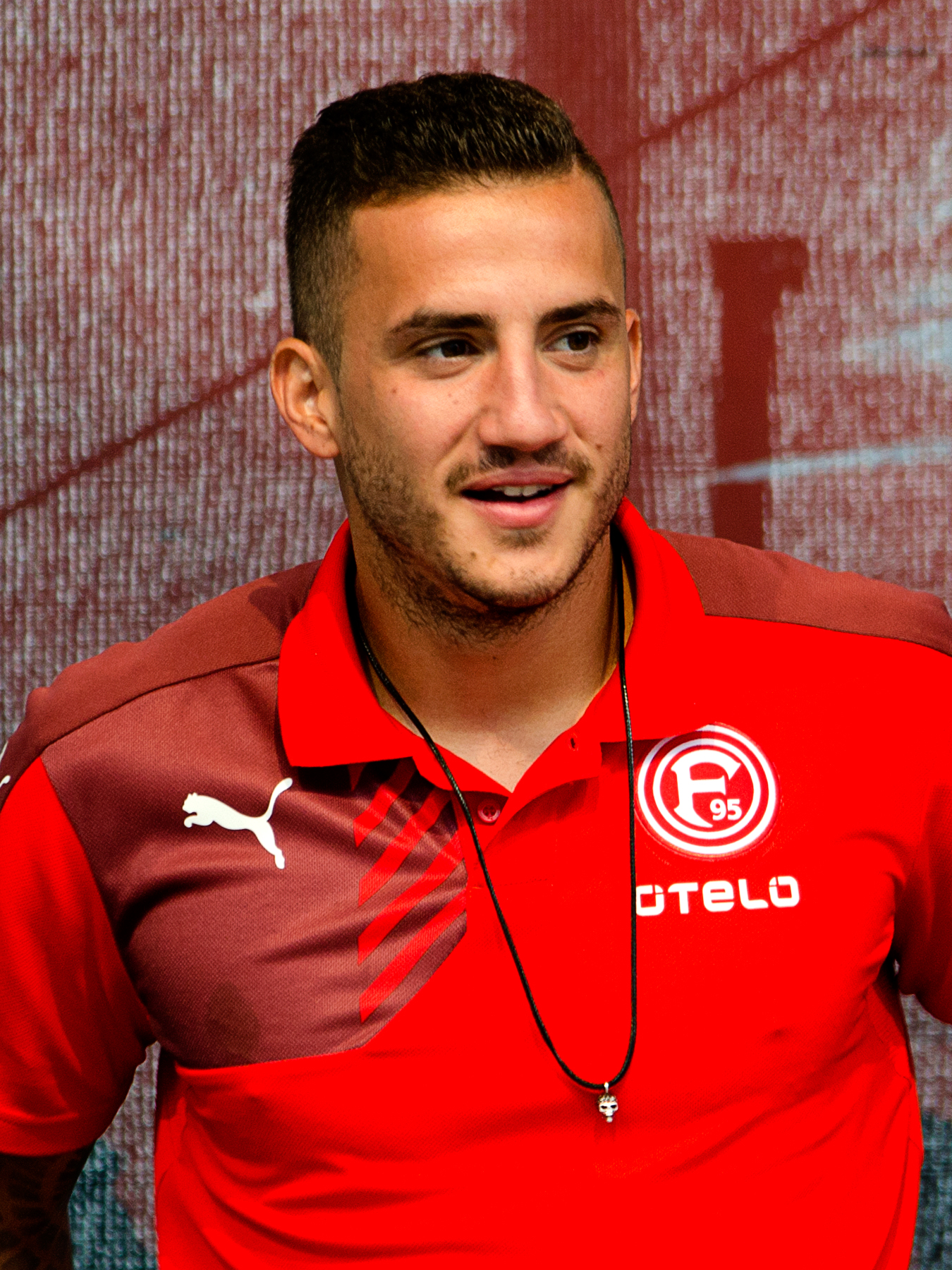
- Sararer in 2015

Personal information
- Full name: Sercan Sararer-Osuna
- Date of birth: 27 November 1989 (age 36)
- Place of birth: Nuremberg, West Germany
- Height: 1.80 m (5 ft 11 in)
- Position: Winger

Team information
- Current team: Hessen Kassel
- Number: 10

Youth career
- 1. FC Röthenbach
- 2000–2006: Greuther Fürth

Senior career*
Years	Team	Apps	(Gls)
2006–2010	Greuther Fürth II	41	(11)
2008–2013	Greuther Fürth	108	(20)
2013–2015	VfB Stuttgart	13	(0)
2014–2015	VfB Stuttgart II	10	(0)
2015–2016	Fortuna Düsseldorf	24	(3)
2016–2018	Greuther Fürth	19	(1)
2018–2019	Karlsruher SC	9	(0)
2020–2022	Türkgücü München	50	(13)
2023–	Hessen Kassel	63	(24)

International career
2012–2013	Turkey	12	(0)
- * Club domestic league appearances and goals as of 24 September 2026

Sercan Sararer-Osuna (Turkish pronunciation: [sæɾdʒan saɾaɾæɾ], born 27 November 1989) is a professional footballer who plays as a winger for Hessen Kassel in Regionalliga Südwest. Born in Germany, he played for the Turkey national team.

== Club career ==
Before joining the youth team of Greuther Fürth in 2000, he played at 1. FC Röthenbach. On 31 July 2011, he scored four goals in a DFB-Pokal game against amateur league team Eimsbütteler TV.

After the end of his contract with Fürth on 1 July 2013, Sararer moved to VfB Stuttgart on a free transfer. On 1 February 2013, Sararer signed a contract until June 2017 with VfB Stuttgart.

For the 2015–16 season he moved to Fortuna Düsseldorf.

== International career ==
On 15 May 2012, Sararer was called up to the Turkey national team for the upcoming friendly matches. He debuted for the Turkey national team in a friendly match against Georgia and made an assist to Hamit Altıntop on 24 May 2012. Turkey won the match 3–1. He also made an assist for the first goal of Umut Bulut against Portugal at the friendly match on 2 June 2012. Turkey won the match 3–1.

== Personal life ==
Sararer's father is Turkish, and his mother is a Spanish Catalan. He also holds a Spanish passport.
