= Sebastian Tyrała =

Polish football manager (born 1988)

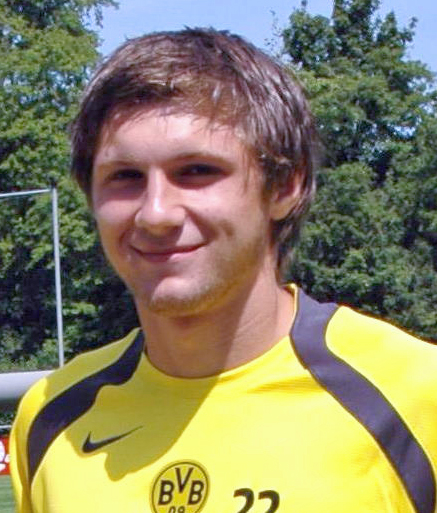
- Tyrala with Borussia Dortmund in 2006

Personal information
- Date of birth: 22 February 1988 (age 38)
- Place of birth: Racibórz, Poland
- Height: 1.71 m (5 ft 7 in)
- Position: Attacking midfielder

Team information
- Current team: Wuppertaler SV (head coach)

Youth career
- 1993–1999: BV Bad Sassendorf
- 1999–2005: Borussia Dortmund

Senior career*
| Years | Team | Apps | (Gls) |
| 2005–2010 | Borussia Dortmund II | 59 | (9) |
| 2005–2010 | Borussia Dortmund | 7 | (0) |
| 2010–2011 | VfL Osnabrück | 31 | (4) |
| 2011–2014 | Greuther Fürth | 7 | (0) |
| 2014–2017 | Rot-Weiß Erfurt | 108 | (10) |
| 2017–2019 | Mainz 05 II | 47 | (2) |
| Total | | 259 | (25) |

International career
| | Germany U19 | 16 | (5) |
| 2009–2010 | Poland U21 | 2 | (1) |
| 2008 | Poland | 1 | (0) |

Managerial career
- 2019–2021: BV Bad Sassendorf (player-coach)
- 2021: Türkspor Dortmund
- 2021–2022: TuS Bövinghausen
- 2022–2024: Türkspor Dortmund
- 2024–: Wuppertaler SV
- * Club domestic league appearances and goals

Sebastian Tyrała (born 22 February 1988) is a Polish professional football manager and player who is currently the head coach of Regionalliga West club Wuppertaler SV. He played primarily as an attacking midfielder.

== Club career ==
Tyrała was born in Racibórz, Poland. He moved to Borussia Dortmund as an 11-year-old boy and passed through all the youth ranks. He was named Sportsman of 2004 in Soest. At age 16, he was selected for Borussia Dortmund's Senior squad. But in 2005, he ruptured the cruciate ligament in his left knee and was sidelined for six months.

Tyrała was honoured by the German Football Association (DFB) with a third place in the category "under 17s" in 2005. He won the "Adler Cup" with Borussia Dortmund's under 17s and became the tournaments top goal-scorer with seven goals. In April 2005, he injured his medial meniscus in training. He made several appearances in preparation for the 2006–07 season and made his full Bundesliga debut on 22 September in an away defeat to Borussia Mönchengladbach. Tyrała also played for Borussia Dortmund's second team and wore the number 28 on his shirt.

After twelve years with Borussia Dortmund, he announced his departure on 18 May 2010 and signed a two-year contract with VfL Osnabrück. On 5 June 2014, he joined FC Rot-Weiß Erfurt.

In May 2019, Tyrała announced his retirement from professional football due to injury problems.

== International career ==
Tyrała has played for Germany's U-19 national team. He scored his first goal in September 2006. In 2007, Tyrała played for Germany in the under 19's European Championships in Austria.

However, he requested a Polish passport, desiring to play for Poland. On 21 November 2008, Tyrała was called up by the Poland national team coach Leo Beenhakker to their national team for friendly matches in Antalya, Turkey. He made his first appearance for the Poland national team in a friendly against Serbia on 14 December 2008.

== Managerial career ==
Since his retirement, Tyrała has worked as a manager in amateur football for BV Bad Sassendorf, Türkspor Dortmund and TuS Bövinghausen. He returned to Türkspor Dortmund in 2022 and led the club to a historic promotion to the Regionalliga West in 2024. Despite this success, he was unexpectedly dismissed in September 2024, just a few months into the 2024–25 season.

In November 2024, Tyrała became new manager of Wuppertaler SV in the Regionalliga West.
