= 2010–11 VfB Stuttgart season =

VfB Stuttgart
2010–11 season
- Manager: Christian Gross (until 13 October 2010); Jens Keller (from 13 October 2010 to 12 December 2010); Bruno Labbadia (from 12 December 2010)
- Stadium: Mercedes-Benz Arena
- Bundesliga: 12th
- DFB-Pokal: Round of 16
- Europa League: Round of 32

The 2010–11 VfB Stuttgart season was the 118th season in the club's football history. They competed in the Bundesliga, the top tier of German football, in which they finished 12th as well as competing in the DFB-Pokal, where they were eliminated in the Round of 16. Following a sixth-place finish in the previous season, they competed in the Europa League, where they were eliminated in the round of 32. It was Stuttgart's 34th consecutive season in the league, since having been promoted from the 2. Bundesliga in 1977.

== Season summary ==
During the previous season, Stuttgart finished 6th in the Bundesliga. As a result, they qualified for the qualification stages of the Europa League. Stuttgart started the season poorly, and manager Christian Gross was sacked on 13 October, with the club bottom of the league. Jens Keller was appointed as his replacement on a temporary basis before Bruno Labbadia was appointed as his permanent replacement on 12 December. The club were knocked out of the DFB-Pokal in the round of 16 by Bayern Munich, and were knocked out of the Europa League in the round of 32 by Benfica. They finished 12th in the Bundesliga on 42 points.

== Players ==
=== First-team squad ===
As of end of season

Note: Flags indicate national team as defined under FIFA eligibility rules; some limited exceptions apply. Players may hold more than one non-FIFA nationality.

No.	Pos.	Nation	Player
1	GK	GER	Sven Ulreich
2	DF	SUI	Philipp Degen (on loan from Liverpool)
3	DF	ITA	Cristian Molinaro
5	DF	GER	Serdar Tasci
6	DF	GER	Georg Niedermeier
7	FW	AUT	Martin Harnik (Note: Harnik was born in Hamburg, West Germany (now Germany), but also qualified to represent Austria internationally through his father and represented Austria at U-19, U-20, and U-21 level before making his international debut for Austria in August 2007.)
8	MF	SRB	Zdravko Kuzmanović (Note: Kuzmanović was born in Thun, Switzerland, and represented Switzerland at U-21 level, but also qualified to represent Serbia and Bosnia and Herzegovina internationally through his parents and made his international debut for Serbia in March 2007.)
9	FW	ROU	Ciprian Marica
11	FW	FRA	Johan Audel (Note: Audel was born in Nice, France, but also qualified to represent Martinique internationally and made his international debut for Martinique in 2016.)
12	GK	GER	Alexander Stolz
13	MF	GER	Timo Gebhart
14	MF	GER	Patrick Funk
15	DF	CIV	Arthur Boka
17	DF	FRA	Matthieu Delpierre
18	FW	GER	Cacau (Note: Cacau was born in Santo André, Brazil, but also qualified to represent Germany internationally after gaining citizenship and made his international debut for Germany in May 2009.)

No.	Pos.	Nation	Player
20	MF	GER	Christian Gentner
21	DF	NED	Khalid Boulahrouz
22	MF	GER	Matthias Schwarz
23	GK	GER	Marc Ziegler
24	MF	GUI	Mamadou Bah
25	MF	BRA	Élson
26	MF	GER	Daniel Didavi
27	DF	GER	Stefano Celozzi
28	MF	HUN	Tamás Hajnal (on loan from Borussia Dortmund)
29	FW	RUS	Pavel Pogrebnyak
31	FW	JPN	Shinji Okazaki
35	DF	GER	Christian Träsch
36	FW	GER	Sven Schipplock
38	DF	GER	Ermin Bičakčić (Note: Bičakčić was born in Zvornik, SFR Yugoslavia (now Bosnia and Herzegovina), and represented Bosnia and Herzegovina at U-19 level, but also qualified to represent Germany internationally and represented Germany at U-18 level before making his international debut for Bosnia and Herzegovina in August 2013.)

=== Left club during season ===
Note: Flags indicate national team as defined under FIFA eligibility rules; some limited exceptions apply. Players may hold more than one non-FIFA nationality.

No. / Pos. / Nation / Player; 16 / MF / GER / Sebastian Rudy (to 1899 Hoffenheim)	No. / Pos. / Nation / Player; 16 / MF / ITA / Mauro Camoranesi (Note: Camoranesi was born in Tandil, Argentina, but also qualified for Italian citizenship through his great-grandfather and made his international debut for Italy in February 2003.) (released)

== Competitions ==
=== Overview ===
Competition	First match	Last match	Starting round	Final position	Record							
Competition	First match	Last match	Starting round	Final position	Pld	W	D	L	GF	GA	GD	Win %
Bundesliga	22 August 2010	14 May 2011	Matchday 1	12th	34	12	6	16	60	59	+1	35.29
DFB-Pokal	14 August 2010	22 December 2010	First round	Round of 16	3	2	0	1	8	8	+0	66.67
Europa League	29 July 2010	24 February 2011	Third qualifying round	Round of 32	15	7	5	3	25	16	+9	46.67
Total					52	21	11	20	93	83	+10	40.38

Last updated: complete
Source: Competitions

=== Bundesliga ===
==== League table ====
Pos	Team	Pld	W	D	L	GF	GA	GD	Pts	Qualification or relegation
10	1. FC Köln	34	13	5	16	47	62	−15	44	
11	1899 Hoffenheim	34	11	10	13	50	50	0	43	
12	VfB Stuttgart	34	12	6	16	60	59	+1	42	
13	Werder Bremen	34	10	11	13	47	61	−14	41	
14	Schalke 04	34	11	7	16	38	44	−6	40	Qualification to Europa League play-off round (Note: Schalke 04 as winners of the 2010–11 DFB-Pokal qualified for the play-off round of the 2011–12 UEFA Europa League.)

Source: kicker
Rules for classification: 1) points; 2) goal difference; 3) number of goals scored.

=== DFB-Pokal ===
14 August 2010 First round	SV Babelsberg	1–2	VfB Stuttgart	Potsdam
15:30 CEST	Stroh-Engel 4'	Report	Cacau 21', 25'	Stadium: Karl-Liebknecht-Stadion; Attendance: 7,500; Referee: Norbert Grudzinski

27 October 2010 Second round	Chemnitzer FC	1–3 (a.e.t.)	VfB Stuttgart	Chemnitz
20:30 CEST	Förster 73'	Report	Harnik 79', 106', 118'	Stadium: Stadion an der Gellertstraße; Attendance: 17,145; Referee: Günter Perl

22 December 2010 Round of 16	VfB Stuttgart	3–6	Bayern Munich	Stuttgart
20:30 CET	Pogrebnyak 32', 45+1'; Delpierre 77'	Report	Ottl 6'; Gómez 8'; Klose 52', 86'; Müller 81'; Ribéry 90+4'	Stadium: Mercedes-Benz Arena; Attendance: 40,500; Referee: Florian Meyer

=== UEFA Europa League ===
==== Qualifying stage ====
29 July 2010 3QR, 1L	Molde (Norway)	2–3	(Germany) Stuttgart	Molde
18:30 CEST	Moström 65'; Hoseth 76'	Report	Rudy 27'; Kuzmanović 74'; Harnik 82'	Stadium: Aker Stadion; Attendance: 3,270; Referee: Bas Nijhuis

5 August 2010 3QR, 2L	Stuttgart (Germany)	2–2 (5–4 agg.)	(Norway) Molde	Stuttgart
20:30 CEST	Pogrebnyak 55'; Gebhart 90+3'	Report	Johansson 41'; Rindarøy 49'	Stadium: Mercedes-Benz Arena; Attendance: 11,500; Referee: Mauro Bergonzi

19 August 2010 Play-off, 1L	Slovan Bratislava (Slovakia)	0–1	(Germany) Stuttgart	Bratislava (Note: Match played at Štadión Pasienky instead of Slovan Bratislava's home stadium Tehelné pole as a result of renovation work)
18:45 CEST		Report	Harnik 88'	Stadium: Štadión Pasienky; Attendance: 8,120; Referee: Tony Chapron

26 August 2010 Play-off, 2L	Stuttgart (Germany)	2–2 (3–2 agg.)	(Slovakia) Slovan Bratislava	Stuttgart
20:00 CEST	Gebhart 56'; Gentner 64'	Report	Dobrotka 9'; Sylvestr 52'	Stadium: Mercedes-Benz Arena; Attendance: 12,100; Referee: Aleksei Nikolaev

==== Group stage ====
Pos	Team	Pld	W	D	L	GF	GA	GD	Pts	Qualification	STU	YB	GET	OB
1	(Germany) VfB Stuttgart	6	5	0	1	16	6	+10	15	Advance to knockout phase	—	3–0	1–0	5–1
2	(Switzerland) Young Boys	6	3	0	3	10	10	0	9	Advance to knockout phase	4–2	—	2–0	4–2
3	(Spain) Getafe	6	2	1	3	4	8	−4	7		0–3	1–0	—	2–1
4	(Denmark) Odense	6	1	1	4	8	14	−6	4		1–2	2–0	1–1	—

Source: Soccerway

16 September 2010 1	Stuttgart (Germany)	3–0	(Switzerland) Young Boys	Stuttgart
21:05 CEST	Cacau 23' (pen.); Gentner 59'; Tasci 90+1'	Report		Stadium: Mercedes-Benz Arena; Attendance: 13,800; Referee: Luca Banti

30 September 2010 2	Odense (Denmark)	1–2	(Germany) Stuttgart	Odense
19:00 CEST	Johansson 78'	Report	Kuzmanović 72'; Harnik 86'	Stadium: TRE-FOR Park; Attendance: 8,854; Referee: Alexandru Deaconu

21 October 2010 3	Stuttgart (Germany)	1–0	(Spain) Getafe	Stuttgart
19:00 CEST	Marica 29'	Report		Stadium: Mercedes-Benz Arena; Attendance: 17,400; Referee: Anastassios Kakos

4 November 2010 4	Getafe (Spain)	0–3	(Germany) Stuttgart	Getafe
21:05 CET		Report	Marica 26'; Gebhart 64'; Harnik 76'	Stadium: Coliseum Alfonso Pérez; Attendance: 3,459; Referee: Marijo Strahonja

1 December 2010 5	Young Boys (Switzerland)	4–2	(Germany) Stuttgart	Bern
19:00 CET	Degen 34'; Sutter 78'; Mayuka 81', 82'	Report	Pogrebnyak 48'; Schipplock 68'	Stadium: Stade de Suisse; Attendance: 18,627; Referee: Alon Yefet

16 December 2010 6	Stuttgart (Germany)	5–1	(Denmark) Odense	Stuttgart
21:05 CET	Gebhart 20'; Høegh 48' (o.g.); Gentner 65'; Møller Christensen 70' (o.g.); Marica 90+3'	Report	Utaka 72'	Stadium: Mercedes-Benz Arena; Attendance: 14,000; Referee: Terje Hauge

==== Knockout stage ====
17 February 2011 Round of 32, First leg	Benfica (Portugal)	2–1	(Germany) Stuttgart	Lisbon
19:00 WET	Cardozo 70'; Jara 81'	Report	Harnik 21'	Stadium: Estádio da Luz; Attendance: 44,852; Referee: Eric Braamhaar

24 February 2011 Round of 32, second leg	Stuttgart (Germany)	0–2 (1–4 agg.)	(Portugal) Benfica	Stuttgart
21:05 CET		Report	Salvio 31'; Cardozo 78'	Stadium: Mercedes-Benz Arena; Attendance: 25,800; Referee: Mike Dean
