= 2009–10 VfB Stuttgart season =

VfB Stuttgart
2009–10 season
- Manager: Markus Babbel (until 6 December); Christian Gross (from 6 December)
- Stadium: Mercedes-Benz Arena
- Bundesliga: 6th
- DFB-Pokal: Third round
- UEFA Champions League: Round of 16
- Top goalscorer: Cacau (13)
Home colours	Away colours	Third colours

During the 2009–10 German football season, VfB Stuttgart competed in the Bundesliga.

== Season summary ==
Manager Markus Babbel was sacked in early December with Stuttgart in 16th place. Christian Gross, his successor, revitalised Stuttgart and they finished in 6th, qualifying for the Europa League.

== Players ==
=== First-team squad ===
Squad at end of season

Note: Flags indicate national team as defined under FIFA eligibility rules; some limited exceptions apply. Players may hold more than one non-FIFA nationality.

No.	Pos.	Nation	Player
1	GK	GER	Jens Lehmann
3	DF	MEX	Ricardo Osorio
4	DF	NED	Khalid Boulahrouz
5	DF	GER	Serdar Tasci
6	DF	GER	Georg Niedermeier
7	MF	GER	Martin Lanig
9	FW	ROU	Ciprian Marica
13	MF	GER	Timo Gebhart
14	MF	GER	Patrick Funk
15	DF	CIV	Arthur Boka
16	MF	GER	Sebastian Rudy
17	DF	FRA	Matthieu Delpierre
18	FW	GER	Cacau (Note: Cacau was born in Santo André, Brazil, but also qualified to represent Germany internationally after gaining citizenship and made his international debut for Germany in May 2009.)
19	DF	GER	Roberto Hilbert

No.	Pos.	Nation	Player
21	DF	ITA	Cristian Molinaro (on loan from Juventus)
22	MF	GER	Matthias Schwarz
23	MF	BLR	Alexander Hleb (on loan from Barcelona)
24	GK	GER	Sven Ulreich
26	MF	GER	Daniel Didavi
27	DF	GER	Stefano Celozzi
28	MF	GER	Sami Khedira
29	FW	RUS	Pavel Pogrebnyak
32	MF	SRB	Zdravko Kuzmanović (Note: Kuzmanović was born in Thun, Switzerland, and represented them at U-21 level, but also qualified to represent Serbia internationally through his father and made his international debut for Serbia in March 2007.)
35	DF	GER	Christian Träsch
38	MF	AUT	Clemens Walch
39	FW	GER	Julian Schieber
42	DF	GER	Marco Pischorn

=== Left club during season ===
Note: Flags indicate national team as defined under FIFA eligibility rules; some limited exceptions apply. Players may hold more than one non-FIFA nationality.

No.	Pos.	Nation	Player
8	MF	CZE	Jan Šimák (to Mainz)
10	MF	TUR	Yıldıray Baştürk (Note: Baştürk was born in Herne, West Germany (now Germany), but also qualified to represent Turkey internationally and made his international debut for Turkey in 1998.) (to Blackburn Rovers)
11	MF	GER	Thomas Hitzlsperger (to Lazio)

No.	Pos.	Nation	Player
21	DF	SUI	Ludovic Magnin (to Zürich)
25	MF	BRA	Élson (on loan to Hannover 96)

=== VfB Stuttgart II ===
The following players played for VfB Stuttgart II, and did not play for the first team this season.

Note: Flags indicate national team as defined under FIFA eligibility rules; some limited exceptions apply. Players may hold more than one non-FIFA nationality.

No. / Pos. / Nation / Player; 12 / GK / GER / Alexander Stolz	No. / Pos. / Nation / Player; 31 / FW / GER / Alessandro Riedle

== Competitions ==
=== Bundesliga ===
==== League table ====
Pos	Team	Pld	W	D	L	GF	GA	GD	Pts	Qualification or relegation
4	Bayer Leverkusen	34	15	14	5	65	38	+27	59	Qualification to Europa League play-off round
5	Borussia Dortmund	34	16	9	9	54	42	+12	57	Qualification to Europa League play-off round
6	VfB Stuttgart	34	15	10	9	51	41	+10	55	Qualification to Europa League third qualifying round (Note: Since both finalists of the 2009–10 DFB-Pokal were qualified for the 2010–11 UEFA Champions League, the 6th-placed team will qualify for the 3rd qualifying round of the 2010–11 UEFA Europa League.)
7	Hamburger SV	34	13	13	8	56	41	+15	52	
8	VfL Wolfsburg	34	14	8	12	64	58	+6	50	

Source: kicker.de (in German)
Rules for classification: 1) points; 2) goal difference; 3) number of goals scored.

==== Results summary ====
Overall								Home						Away					
Pld	W	D	L	GF	GA	GD	Pts	W	D	L	GF	GA	GD	W	D	L	GF	GA	GD
34	15	10	9	51	41	+10	55	8	5	4	28	21	+7	7	5	5	23	20	+3

Source: Soccerway

==== Matches ====
7 August 2009 1	VfL Wolfsburg	2–0	VfB Stuttgart	Wolfsburg
20:30 CEST (UTC+2)	Misimović 71'; Grafite 82'	Report		Stadium: Volkswagen Arena; Referee: Felix Brych; Assistant referees: Marco Achmüller, Robert Hartmann; Fourth official: Matthias Anklam

15 August 2009 2	VfB Stuttgart	4–2	SC Freiburg	Stuttgart
15:30 CEST (UTC+2)	Pogrebnyak 53'; Élson 65' (pen.), 76', (yellow card) 74'; Gebhart (yellow card) 71'; Schieber 89'	Report	Idrissou (yellow card) 35', (goal) 70', 85'; Krmaš (yellow card) 58'; Salz (yellow card) 64'	Stadium: Mercedes-Benz Arena; Referee: Lutz Wagner; Assistant referees: Bastian Dankert, Daniel Siebert; Fourth official: Frederick Assmuth

22 August 2009 3	Borussia Dortmund	1–1	VfB Stuttgart	Dortmund
15:30 CEST (UTC+2)	Barrios (yellow card) 17'; Valdez 27', (yellow card) 81'	Report	Niedermeier 47'; Hitzlsperger (yellow card) 66'; Gebhart (yellow card) 82'	Stadium: Signal Iduna Park; Referee: Helmut Fleischer; Assistant referees: Sönke Glindemann, Guido Kleve; Fourth official: Thorsten Schriever

29 August 2009 4	VfB Stuttgart	0–0	1. FC Nürnberg	Stuttgart
15:30 CEST (UTC+2)	Gebhart (yellow card) 88'	Report	Risse (yellow card) 84'	Stadium: Mercedes-Benz Arena; Referee: Babak Rafati; Assistant referees: Matthias Anklam, Patrick Ittrich; Fourth official: Torsten Bauer

12 September 2009 5	Hamburger SV	3–1	VfB Stuttgart	Hamburg
18:30 CEST (UTC+2)	Petrić 30'; Elia 58', (yellow card) 72'; Zé Roberto 90+1'	Report	Tasci (yellow card) 32'; Pogrebnyak 62'; Lehmann (yellow card) 70'; Magnin (yellow card) 79'	Stadium: HSH Nordbank Arena; Referee: Wolfgang Stark; Assistant referees: Mike Pickel, Thorsten Schiffner; Fourth official: Georg Schalk

19 September 2009 6	VfB Stuttgart	0–2	1. FC Köln	Stuttgart
15:30 CEST (UTC+2)	Élson (yellow card) 49'; Kuzmanović (yellow card) 56'; Boka (yellow card) 63'; Gebhart (yellow card) 73'	Report	Freis 25'; Petit (yellow card) 34'; Podolski (yellow card) 37'; Sanou 89'	Stadium: Mercedes-Benz Arena; Referee: Michael Weiner; Assistant referees: Thomas Frank, Norbert Grudzinski; Fourth official: René Kunsleben

26 September 2009 7	Eintracht Frankfurt	0–3	VfB Stuttgart	Frankfurt
15:30 CEST (UTC+2)	Russ (red card) 33'; Teber (yellow card) 57'	Report	Schieber 17', 31'; Hitzlsperger 54'	Stadium: Commerzbank-Arena; Referee: Manuel Gräfe; Assistant referees: Mark Borsch, Markus Hacker; Fourth official: Thomas Metzen

4 October 2009 8	VfB Stuttgart	0–2	Werder Bremen	Stuttgart
15:30 CEST (UTC+2)	Cacau (yellow card) 59'; Delpierre (yellow card) 68'	Report	Pizarro 3'; Naldo (yellow card) 26'; Hunt 51'	Stadium: Mercedes-Benz Arena; Referee: Florian Meyer; Assistant referees: Carsten Kadach, Frank Willenborg; Fourth official: Holger Henschel

17 October 2009 9	VfB Stuttgart	1–2	Schalke 04	Stuttgart
15:30 CEST (UTC+2)	Magnin (yellow card) 33'; Khedira (yellow card) 38'; Cacau (yellow card) 58', (goal) 73'; Tasci (yellow card) 77'	Report	Rakitić 24'; Mineiro (yellow card) 43'; Moritz (yellow card) 50'; Kurányi 76'; Farfán (yellow card) 90+3'	Stadium: Mercedes-Benz Arena; Referee: Felix Brych; Assistant referees: Marco Achmüller, Robert Hartmann; Fourth official: Josef Maier

24 October 2009 10	Hannover 96	1–0	VfB Stuttgart	Hanover
15:30 CEST (UTC+2)	Ya Konan 30', (yellow card) 73'; Štajner (yellow card) 83'; Chahed (yellow card) 90+1'	Report	Élson (yellow card) 40'; Hleb (yellow card) 61'; Tasci (yellow card) 73'; Osorio (yellow card) 85'; Marica (yellow card) 88'; Lehmann (yellow card) 90+2'	Stadium: AWD-Arena; Referee: Guido Winkmann; Assistant referees: Christian Bandurski, Dirk Margenberg; Fourth official: Malte Dittrich

31 October 2009 11	VfB Stuttgart	0–0	Bayern Munich	Stuttgart
15:30 CET (UTC+1)	Delpierre (yellow card) 35'; Kuzmanović (yellow card) 47'; Gebhart (yellow card) 89'	Report	Van Bommel (yellow card) 18'; Toni (yellow card) 76'	Stadium: Mercedes-Benz Arena; Referee: Michael Kempter; Assistant referees: Frederick Assmuth, Tobias Welz; Fourth official: Tobias Christ

7 November 2009 12	Borussia Mönchengladbach	0–0	VfB Stuttgart	Mönchengladbach
15:30 CET (UTC+1)	Dante (yellow card) 45'	Report	Kuzmanović (yellow card) 65'; Pogrebnyak (yellow card) 77'	Stadium: Borussia-Park; Referee: Günter Perl; Assistant referees: Josef Maier, Georg Schalk; Fourth official: Christoph Bornhorst

21 November 2009 13	VfB Stuttgart	1–1	Hertha BSC	Stuttgart
15:30 CET (UTC+1)	Kuzmanović (yellow card) 43' (yellow-red card) 85', (goal) 82'; Cacau (yellow card) 71'	Report	Ramos 49', (yellow card) 75'; Lustenberger (yellow card) 52'; Piszczek (yellow card) 70'; Drobný (yellow card) 77'	Stadium: Mercedes-Benz Arena; Referee: Peter Gagelmann; Assistant referees: Matthias Anklam, Tobias Stieler; Fourth official: Mike Pickel

29 November 2009 14	Bayer Leverkusen	4–0	VfB Stuttgart	Leverkusen
15:30 CET (UTC+1)	Kießling 22', 59', 87' (pen.); Derdiyok 38'	Report	Rudy (yellow card) 21'; Cacau (yellow card) 42'; Boka (yellow card) 56'; Tasci (yellow card) 67'; Hilbert (yellow card) 85'; Lehmann (yellow card) 86'	Stadium: BayArena; Referee: Florian Meyer; Assistant referees: Carsten Kadach, Florian Steuer; Fourth official: René Kunsleben

5 December 2009 15	VfB Stuttgart	1–1	VfL Bochum	Stuttgart
15:30 CET (UTC+1)	Träsch (yellow card) 17'; Tasci (yellow card) 33', (goal) 63'	Report	Klimowicz (red card) 81'; Fuchs 89', (yellow card) 90+2'; Prokoph (yellow card) 90+2'	Stadium: Mercedes-Benz Arena; Referee: Lutz Wagner; Assistant referees: Bastian Dankert, Daniel Siebert; Fourth official: Guido Kleve

13 December 2009 16	Mainz 05	1–1	VfB Stuttgart	Mainz
15:30 CET (UTC+1)	Polanski 90' (pen.); Soto (yellow card) 90+4'	Report	Pogrebnyak 11', (yellow card) 86'; Hleb (yellow card) 68'; Lehmann (red card) 87'	Stadium: Bruchwegstadion; Referee: Wolfgang Stark; Assistant referees: Frederick Assmuth, Christian Leicher; Fourth official: Christian Bandurski

19 December 2009 17	VfB Stuttgart	3–1	1899 Hoffenheim	Stuttgart
18:30 CET (UTC+1)	Marica 32' (pen.), (yellow card) 60'; Delpierre (yellow card) 43'; Gebhart (yellow card) 65'; Cacau (yellow card) 68'; Khedira 82'	Report	Luiz Gustavo (yellow card) 40' (yellow-red card) 52'; Maicosuel 44'; Obasi (yellow card) 87'	Stadium: Mercedes-Benz Arena; Referee: Manuel Gräfe; Assistant referees: Christian Dingert, Markus Hacker; Fourth official: Robert Hartmann

16 January 2010 18	VfB Stuttgart	3–1	VfL Wolfsburg	Stuttgart
18:30 CET (UTC+1)	Hilbert 28'; Tasci (yellow card) 49'; Pogrebnyak 58'; Gebhart 87'	Report	Madlung (yellow card) 41'; Džeko 65'	Stadium: Mercedes-Benz Arena; Referee: Peter Sippel; Assistant referees: Tobias Christ, Walter Hofmann; Fourth official: Michael Emmer

22 January 2010 19	SC Freiburg	0–1	VfB Stuttgart	Freiburg
20:30 CET (UTC+1)	Toprak (yellow card) 84'; Caligiuri (yellow card) 89'; Makiadi (yellow card) 90+1'	Report	Marica 41'; Tasci (yellow card) 69'	Stadium: Badenova-Stadion; Referee: Felix Brych; Assistant referees: Marco Achmüller, Tobias Stieler; Fourth official: Alexander Schlutius

31 January 2010 20	VfB Stuttgart	4–1	Borussia Dortmund	Stuttgart
15:30 CET (UTC+1)	Santana 14' (o.g.); Marica (yellow card) 32', (penalty missed) 48', 86'; Pogrebnyak (yellow card) 50'; Kuzmanović 77'; Träsch 89'	Report	Şahin (yellow card) 33'; Barrios 55', (yellow card) 61'; Santana (yellow card) 65'; Schmelzer (yellow card) 76'	Stadium: Mercedes-Benz Arena; Referee: Peter Gagelmann; Assistant referees: Matthias Anklam, Daniel Siebert; Fourth official: Josef Maier

6 February 2010 21	1. FC Nürnberg	1–2	VfB Stuttgart	Nuremberg
18:30 CET (UTC+1)	Bunjaku 60'; Breno (yellow card) 79'; Schäfer (yellow card) 87'	Report	Gebhart 22', (yellow card) 79'; Marica (yellow card) 48'; Hilbert 87'	Stadium: easyCredit-Stadion; Referee: Felix Zwayer; Assistant referees: Christoph Bornhorst, Florian Steuer; Fourth official: Holger Henschel

13 February 2010 22	VfB Stuttgart	1–3	Hamburger SV	Stuttgart
15:30 CET (UTC+1)	Marica (yellow card) 45+1'; Träsch 55'	Report	Berg 23'; Van Nistelrooy 75', 76'; Jarolím (yellow card) 86'	Stadium: Mercedes-Benz Arena; Referee: Deniz Aytekin; Assistant referees: Christian Bandurski, Thorsten Schiffner; Fourth official: Georg Schalk

20 February 2010 23	1. FC Köln	1–5	VfB Stuttgart	Cologne
15:30 CET (UTC+1)	Schorch 44'; Geromel (yellow card) 51'	Report	Cacau 13', 31', 38', 74'; Hleb (yellow card) 22'; Gebhart (yellow card) 48'; Pogrebnyak 69'	Stadium: RheinEnergieStadion; Referee: Manuel Gräfe; Assistant referees: Christian Dingert, Markus Hacker; Fourth official: Mark Borsch

27 February 2010 24	VfB Stuttgart	2–1	Eintracht Frankfurt	Stuttgart
15:30 CET (UTC+1)	Cacau 41', 45'; Delpierre (yellow card) 90+2'; Marica (yellow card) 90+2'	Report	Köhler 39'; Schwegler (yellow card) 76'; Spycher (yellow card) 88'	Stadium: Mercedes-Benz Arena; Referee: Jochen Drees; Assistant referees: Torsten Bauer, Christian Fischer; Fourth official: Michael Emmer

6 March 2010 25	Werder Bremen	2–2	VfB Stuttgart	Bremen
15:30 CET (UTC+1)	Frings (yellow card) 74', (goal) 81' (pen.); Almeida 75'	Report	Pogrebnyak 15'; Khedira 43'; Delpierre (yellow card) 89'	Stadium: Weserstadion; Referee: Felix Brych; Assistant referees: Frederick Assmuth, Tobias Stieler; Fourth official: Bastian Dankert

12 March 2010 26	Schalke 04	2–1	VfB Stuttgart	Gelsenkirchen
20:30 CET (UTC+1)	Höwedes (yellow card) 28'; Edu 46'; Kurányi 55'; Rafinha (yellow card) 70'	Report	Niedermeier (yellow card) 17'; Tasci 50', (yellow card) 72'	Stadium: Veltins-Arena; Referee: Lutz Wagner; Assistant referees: Christoph Bornhorst, Norbert Grudzinski; Fourth official: Stefan Lupp

20 March 2010 27	VfB Stuttgart	2–0	Hannover 96	Stuttgart
15:30 CET (UTC+1)	Marica 36', 54'	Report	Balitsch (yellow card) 49'; Cherundolo (yellow card) 58'	Stadium: Mercedes-Benz Arena; Referee: Guido Winkmann; Assistant referees: Christian Bandurski, Dirk Margenberg; Fourth official: Thorsten Schiffner

27 March 2010 28	Bayern Munich	1–2	VfB Stuttgart	Munich
15:30 CET (UTC+1)	Olić 32'; Van Bommel (yellow card) 74'	Report	Träsch 41'; Cacau (yellow card) 43'; Marica 50'	Stadium: Allianz Arena; Referee: Florian Meyer; Assistant referees: Carsten Kadach, Frank Willenborg; Fourth official: Christian Dingert

3 April 2010 29	VfB Stuttgart	2–1	Borussia Mönchengladbach	Stuttgart
15:30 CEST (UTC+2)	Boulahrouz (yellow card) 62'; Marica 66'; Kuzmanović 83'	Report	Reus 33'; Friend (yellow card) 40'; Levels (yellow card) 67'	Stadium: Mercedes-Benz Arena; Referee: Helmut Fleischer; Assistant referees: Sönke Glindemann, Guido Kleve; Fourth official: Robert Hartmann

10 April 2010 30	Hertha BSC	0–1	VfB Stuttgart	Berlin
15:30 CEST (UTC+2)	Gekas (yellow card) 33'; Raffael (yellow card) 83'; Wichniarek (yellow card) 84'; Kobiashvili (yellow card) 89'	Report	Kuzmanović (yellow card) 26'; Pogrebnyak (yellow card) 43'; Cacau 74'; Gebhart (yellow card) 89'	Stadium: Olympiastadion; Referee: Michael Weiner; Assistant referees: Thomas Frank, Norbert Grudzinski; Fourth official: Holger Henschel

17 April 2010 31	VfB Stuttgart	2–1	Bayer Leverkusen	Stuttgart
15:30 CEST (UTC+2)	Cacau 15', 85', (yellow card) 16'; Delpierre (yellow card) 24'; Marica (yellow card) 78'; Pogrebnyak (yellow card) 90+2'	Report	Kießling 13'; Barnetta (yellow card) 16' (yellow-red card) 19'; Sarpei (yellow card) 55'	Stadium: Mercedes-Benz Arena; Referee: Manuel Gräfe; Assistant referees: Christian Dingert, Markus Hacker; Fourth official: Robert Kempter

23 April 2010 32	VfL Bochum	0–2	VfB Stuttgart	Bochum
20:30 CEST (UTC+2)	Šesták (yellow card) 18'; Pfertzel (yellow card) 52'; Bönig (yellow card) 67'; Maltritz (yellow card) 77'	Report	Cacau 14'; Marica 18'	Stadium: RewirpowerSTADION; Referee: Peter Gagelmann; Assistant referees: Matthias Anklam, Sascha Thielert; Fourth official: Stefan Trautmann

1 May 2010 33	VfB Stuttgart	2–2	Mainz 05	Stuttgart
15:30 CEST (UTC+2)	Hilbert (yellow card) 54'; Gebhart (yellow card) 60'; Marica 73', 75'; Cacau (yellow card) 88'	Report	Fathi 52'; Karhan (yellow card) 55'; Schürrle 63'; Zabavník (yellow card) 90+2'	Stadium: Mercedes-Benz Arena; Referee: Felix Zwayer; Assistant referees: Dirk Margenberg, Florian Steuer; Fourth official: Michael Emmer

8 May 2010 34	1899 Hoffenheim	1–1	VfB Stuttgart	Sinsheim
15:30 CEST (UTC+2)	Salihović (yellow card) 6'; Šimunić (yellow card) 22'; Vukčević 44'	Report	Cacau 19', (yellow card) 81'; Molinaro (yellow card) 66'	Stadium: Rhein-Neckar-Arena; Referee: Jochen Drees; Assistant referees: Torsten Bauer, Tobias Christ; Fourth official: Walter Hofmann

=== DFB-Pokal ===
1 August 2009 First round	SG Sonnenhof Großaspach	1–4	VfB Stuttgart	Heilbronn
15:30 UTC+2	Ismaili 37' Aupperle (yellow card) 43' (yellow-red card) 90'	Report (in German)	Hitzlsperger 55'; Cacau 62'; Šimák 66', 88'	Stadium: Frankenstadion; Attendance: 15,000; Referee: Michael Kempter (Sauldorf)

23 September 2009 Second round	VfB Lübeck	1–3 (a.e.t.)	VfB Stuttgart	Lübeck
20:30 UTC+2	Henning 6'	Report (in German)	Schieber 77'; Khedira 109'; Cacau 118'	Stadium: Lohmühle; Attendance: 16.900; Referee: Peter Gagelmann (Bremen)

27 October 2009 Round of 16	SpVgg Greuther Fürth	1–0	VfB Stuttgart	Fürth
19:00 UTC+1	Nehrig 32'	Report (in German)		Stadium: Playmobil-Stadion; Attendance: 10,800; Referee: Babak Rafati (Hanover)

=== Champions League ===
==== Play-off round ====
18 August 2009 First leg	Timișoara (Romania)	0–2	(Germany) Stuttgart	Timișoara
20:45		Report	Gebhart 28' (pen.); Hleb 30'	Stadium: Stadionul Dan Păltinișanu; Attendance: 23,446; Referee: Olegário Benquerença (Portugal)

26 August 2009 Second leg	Stuttgart (Germany)	0–0 (2–0 agg.)	(Romania) Timișoara	Stuttgart
20:45		Report		Stadium: Mercedes-Benz Arena; Attendance: 27,500; Referee: Roberto Rosetti (Italy)

==== Group stage ====
Pos	Team	Pld	W	D	L	GF	GA	GD	Pts	Qualification	SEV	STU	URZ	RAN
1	(Spain) Sevilla	6	4	1	1	11	4	+7	13	Advance to knockout phase	—	1–1	2–0	1–0
2	(Germany) VfB Stuttgart	6	2	3	1	9	7	+2	9	Advance to knockout phase	1–3	—	3–1	1–1
3	(Romania) Unirea Urziceni	6	2	2	2	8	8	0	8	Transfer to Europa League	1–0	1–1	—	1–1
4	(Scotland) Rangers	6	0	2	4	4	13	−9	2		1–4	0–2	1–4	—

Source: RSSSF

16 September 2009 1	Stuttgart (Germany)	1–1	(Scotland) Rangers	Stuttgart
20:45	Pogrebnyak 18'	Report	Bougherra 77'	Stadium: Mercedes-Benz Arena; Attendance: 39,000; Referee: Massimo Busacca (Switzerland)

29 September 2009 2	Unirea Urziceni (Romania)	1–1	(Germany) Stuttgart	Bucharest (Note: Unirea Urziceni played their home group matches at Stadionul Steaua in Bucharest as their Stadionul Tineretului did not meet UEFA criteria.)
20:45	Varga 48'	Report	Tasci 5'	Stadium: Stadionul Steaua; Attendance: 13,557; Referee: Laurent Duhamel (France)

20 October 2009 3	Stuttgart (Germany)	1–3	(Spain) Sevilla	Stuttgart
20:45	Élson 74'	Report	Squillaci 23', 72'; Navas 55'	Stadium: Mercedes-Benz Arena; Attendance: 37,000; Referee: Pieter Vink (Netherlands)

4 November 2009 4	Sevilla (Spain)	1–1	(Germany) Stuttgart	Seville
20:45	Navas 14'	Report	Kuzmanović 79'	Stadium: Ramón Sánchez Pizjuán; Attendance: 32,669; Referee: Martin Atkinson (England)

24 November 2009 5	Rangers (Scotland)	0–2	(Germany) Stuttgart	Glasgow
20:45		Report	Rudy 16'; Kuzmanović 59'	Stadium: Ibrox Stadium; Attendance: 41,468; Referee: Roberto Rosetti (Italy)

9 December 2009 6	Stuttgart (Germany)	3–1	(Romania) Unirea Urziceni	Stuttgart
20:45	Marica 5'; Träsch 8'; Pogrebnyak 11'	Report	Semedo 46'	Stadium: Mercedes-Benz Arena; Attendance: 37,000; Referee: Viktor Kassai (Hungary)

==== Knockout phase ====
===== Round of 16 =====
23 February 2010 First leg	Stuttgart (Germany)	1–1	(Spain) Barcelona	Stuttgart
20:45	Cacau 25'	Report	Ibrahimović 52'	Stadium: Mercedes-Benz Arena; Attendance: 39,430; Referee: Björn Kuipers (Netherlands)

17 March 2010 Second leg	Barcelona (Spain)	4–0 (5–1 agg.)	(Germany) Stuttgart	Barcelona
20:45	Messi 13', 60'; Pedro 22'; Bojan 89'	Report		Stadium: Camp Nou; Attendance: 88,543; Referee: Alain Hamer (Luxembourg)
