= Georg Niedermeier =

German footballer (born 1986)

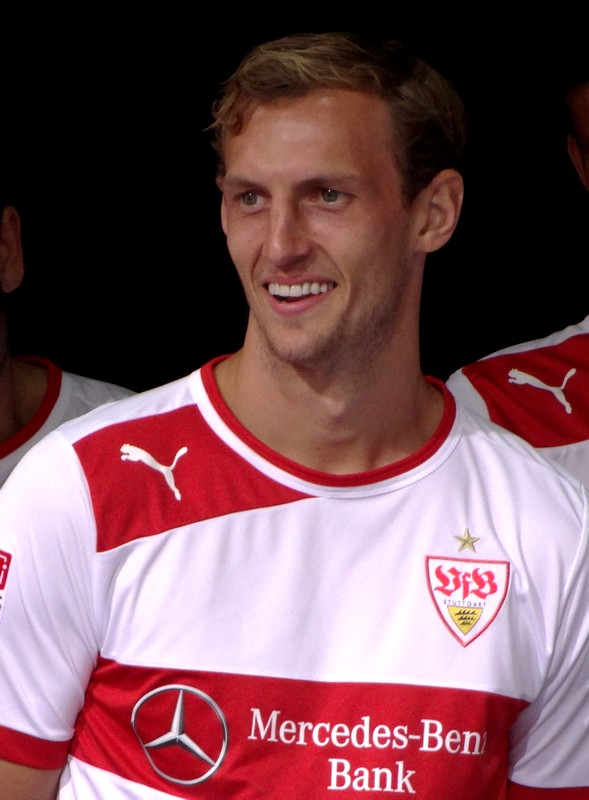
- Niedermeier in 2012

Personal information
- Date of birth: 26 February 1986 (age 40)
- Place of birth: Munich, West Germany
- Height: 1.90 m (6 ft 3 in)
- Position: Defender

Youth career
- 1991–1995: SC Bogenhausen
- 1995–2003: Bayern Munich

Senior career*
Years	Team	Apps	(Gls)
2003–2009	Bayern Munich II	86	(0)
2009–2016	VfB Stuttgart	148	(12)
2016–2018	SC Freiburg	6	(0)
2018	→ SC Freiburg II	4	(1)
2018–2019	Melbourne Victory	19	(2)
2023	New Plymouth Rangers	2	(1)

International career
2002–2004	Germany U17	14	(0)
2004–2005	Germany U19	3	(0)
- * Club domestic league appearances and goals

Georg Niedermeier (born 26 February 1986), nicknamed "Niederstrecker", is a former German professional footballer who played as a defender. A product of the Bayern Munich youth academy, Niedermeier began his senior career with Bayern Munich's reserve team before moving to VfB Stuttgart in 2009 (initially on loan). He signed permanently in February 2010 for a reported fee of €3.5 million. He went on to make over 180 appearances for Stuttgart across eight Bundesliga seasons, becoming a regular starter and serving in the club's leadership group. Niedermeier later played for SC Freiburg in the Bundesliga and had a stint with Melbourne Victory in Australia's A-League, before joining New Zealand's Taranaki Premiership club New Plymouth Rangers in 2023. He also represented Germany at youth level, winning 14 caps for the under-17 national team as well as 3 caps for the under-19 national team. After retiring from playing, Niedermeier pursued coaching education: in 2023 he undertook coaching courses in Australia and obtained his Football Australia “C” and “B”-Diploma.

== Early life and youth career ==
Georg Niedermeier was born and raised in Bogenhausen, a district in the north-east of Munich, Bavaria (then West Germany). He began playing football at the local club, SC Bogenhausen, as a child. In 1995, at the age of nine, he joined the youth academy of FC Bayern Munich, where he would spend the next several years progressing through all the youth levels. While training at Bayern's academy, Niedermeier attended the Theodolinden-Gymnasium in Munich and completed his Abitur (secondary school diploma) in 2005. Initially deployed as a striker in his early teens, he was later moved into a defensive role due to his notable strength in tackling, one-on-one duels, and his strong aerial abilities.

By the early 2000s, Niedermeier had established himself as a promising centre-back in Bayern's youth setup. He captained Bayern's Under-19 side and was part of the team that won the German U-19 Bundesliga championship in 2004. After graduating from the youth teams, he joined Bayern Munich II (the club's reserve side) and made his debut in the Regionalliga (then the third tier of German football) in late 2003, aged 17. Niedermeier went on to become captain of Bayern Munich II, leading the reserve team in the inaugural 3. Liga season in 2008. His development at Bayern Munich, combining both academic education and football training, laid the foundation for his professional career.

== Club career ==
=== Bayern Munich (2003–2009) ===
Niedermeier progressed through all stages of Bayern Munich's academy, eventually captaining the reserve team. He made his Bayern II debut as a 17-year-old on 18 October 2003, in a 0–0 draw against FC Augsburg. In 2004, whilst taking the step to the Seniors team, Niedermeier helped Bayern's Under-19 side win the U19s Youth Bundesliga Championship.

At the start of the 2008–09 season in the newly formed national 3. Liga, Niedermeier was handed the captain's armband for the opening match against Union Berlin, a 2–1 victory. That same year, he began training with the first team and was named in matchday squads for Bundesliga fixtures against Hamburger SV and Borussia Dortmund, as well as for a UEFA Champions League match against Olympique Lyonnais.

In January 2009, Niedermeier signed a new contract, keeping him at Bayern Munich until 2012.

=== VfB Stuttgart (2009–2016) ===
On 30 January 2009, Niedermeier joined VfB Stuttgart on loan from Bayern Munich until June 2010, seeking regular first-team experience.

==== 2008–09 season ====
He made his Bundesliga debut on 1 March 2009, starting in a 2–0 win over local rivals Karlsruher SC. A week later, he sustained an ankle injury during a match against Borussia Dortmund that sidelined him for a month. He returned to the starting line-up on 9 May 2009 in a 4–1 win over eventual champions VfL Wolfsburg.

Niedermeier made five league appearances in the second half of the season, contributing to Stuttgart's strong run to a third-place Bundesliga finish and qualification for the 2009–10 UEFA Champions League.

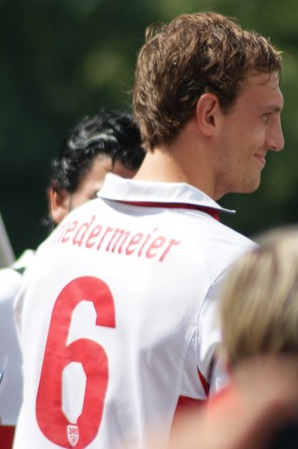
Niedermeier at VfB Stuttgart's team presentation in 2009

==== 2009–10 season ====
In the 2009–10 Bundesliga season, Niedermeier scored his first Bundesliga goal with a header in a 1–1 draw at Signal Iduna Park against Borussia Dortmund on 28 August 2009. Competition from Serdar Tasci, Khalid Boulahrouz, and Matthieu Delpierre limited his starting opportunities, but he returned to the first team in November following injuries to teammates. He made his UEFA Champions League debut in a 2–0 away win against Glasgow Rangers at Ibrox-Park on 24 November 2009. After the winter break, he started the first four league matches of 2010, all of which ended in victory. On 11 February, Niedermeier signed a four-year contract with Stuttgart, making the move permanent and keeping him at the club until June 2014. He featured again in March, including a Champions League round of 16 match against FC Barcelona at Camp Nou. His performances drew praise from manager Christian Gross, who highlighted his composure and confidence.

Stuttgart finished the season in sixth place, qualifying for the UEFA Europa League 2010/11. Niedermeier made 14 appearances in all competitions, scoring once and losing only two matches.

==== 2010–11 season ====
At the start of the 2010–11 Bundesliga season, Niedermeier established himself as a regular starter for Stuttgart, forming a central defensive partnership with either Matthieu Delpierre or Serdar Tasci. He helped the club reach the UEFA Europa League group stage, featuring in qualifying wins over Molde and Slovan Bratislava. During the first half of the season, Niedermeier scored four goals in the Bundesliga, including in victories against Borussia Mönchengladbach, St. Pauli and Werder Bremen, as well as in a narrow defeat to Hannover 96. Despite his individual performances, Stuttgart endured a poor start, collecting only 12 points and sitting bottom of the table at the winter break. However, the team topped their Europa League group and advanced to the knockout stage, with Niedermeier contributing defensively throughout the campaign. He returned to the first team after the break under new head coach Bruno Labbadia and remained a regular starter, missing only one match in the second half of the season due to suspension. On 20 March 2011, he scored his fifth goal of the season in a 1–1 draw against VfL Wolfsburg.

Stuttgart improved in the second half of the season and ultimately finished 12th in the Bundesliga. Niedermeier made 42 appearances in all competitions and scored five goals, making him the highest-scoring defender in the Bundesliga during the 2010–11 season.

==== 2011–12 season ====
Ahead of the 2011–12 Bundesliga season, Niedermeier suffered a knee injury during a friendly match against Stuttgarter Kickers. On 25 July 2011, it was confirmed that he would be sidelined for two months following surgery. He returned to training in September to work on regaining match fitness. Niedermeier made his competitive return on 20 November 2011, starting in a 2–1 win over FC Augsburg. From then on, he reclaimed his place in central defence. During a 4–1 victory over SC Freiburg on 27 February 2012, he was substituted in the 66th minute due to injury, but subsequent scans revealed no fractures in the rib area.

On 16 March 2012, Niedermeier captained Stuttgart for the first time in his career, leading the team to a 2–1 win against TSG 1899 Hoffenheim. He continued as captain in the following two matches, against 1. FC Nürnberg and the dramatic 4–4 draw against Borussia Dortmund.

Stuttgart finished 6th in the Bundesliga, securing qualification for the following season's UEFA Europa League. Despite missing part of the campaign through injury, Niedermeier made 19 appearances in all competitions.

==== 2012–13 season ====
Niedermeier began the 2012–13 Bundesliga season positively, assisting the opening goal in a 5–0 win over SV Falkensee-Finkenkrug in the first round of the DFB-Pokal. He retained his place in the starting line-up from the start of the campaign, playing regularly as a central defender. In Stuttgart's first Europa League group stage match, he scored in a 2–2 draw against Steaua București. On 23 September 2012, in a league match against Werder Bremen, Niedermeier was deployed in an attacking role after coming on for Shinji Okazaki and assisted Cacau's equaliser to make it 2–2, which remained the final result. He continued to feature in Stuttgart's UEFA Europa League run, helping the club progress to the knockout stage.

On 9 January 2013, Niedermeier extended his contract with VfB Stuttgart until June 2016. He scored his second goal of the season on 17 March 2013, netting the winner in a 2–1 victory over Eintracht Frankfurt. In the following match against Borussia Dortmund, he was sent off for a second bookable offence on Mario Götze in a 2–1 defeat. After serving a one-match suspension, he returned to the starting line-up and helped Stuttgart secure a 2–0 win over Borussia Mönchengladbach. In the subsequent fixture, he played in a 2–1 victory over SC Freiburg, which sent Stuttgart to the DFB-Pokal final — their first since 2007 and sixth in club history.

Niedermeier started in the DFB-Pokal final against Bayern Munich on 1 June 2013, where Stuttgart lost 3–2.

Stuttgart finished 12th in the Bundesliga but qualified again for the following season's UEFA Europa League by reaching the DFB-Pokal final. Despite missing five matches during the campaign for various reasons, Niedermeier made 40 appearances in all competitions and scored two goals.

==== 2013–14 season ====
At the start of the 2013–14 Bundesliga season, Niedermeier suffered a knee injury during the second leg of the UEFA Europa League third qualifying round against Botev Plovdiv. He was substituted in the 64th minute as Stuttgart drew 0–0, resulting in elimination on away goals after a 1–1 draw in the first leg. After completing rehabilitation in late September, he returned to the starting line-up on 25 October 2013 in a 1–1 draw against 1. FC Nürnberg. However, later in the year he was dropped to the bench. Amid defensive struggles, Niedermeier returned to the starting line-up as captain in a 4–1 loss to TSG 1899 Hoffenheim, and also wore the captain's armband in the following match against Hertha BSC, which ended in a 2–1 defeat. On 15 March 2014, he scored his first goal of the season in a 1–1 draw against Werder Bremen. Two weeks later, during a 3–2 loss to Borussia Dortmund on 29 March, he was sent off in the 67th minute for unsportsmanlike conduct. Despite the red card, Niedermeier regained a regular starting role under new head coach Huub Stevens and featured consistently throughout the remainder of the season.

Stuttgart finished 15th in the Bundesliga, narrowly avoiding relegation after a turbulent season. Niedermeier made 20 appearances in all competitions and scored one goal.

==== 2014–15 season ====
At the start of the 2014–15 Bundesliga season, under returning head coach Armin Veh, Niedermeier found himself behind in the pecking order and started the campaign on the bench, also dealing with injury concerns. He made his first appearance of the season on 24 September 2014, coming on as a 79th-minute substitute in a 2–2 draw against Borussia Dortmund. On 25 October, he assisted the club's fourth goal in a 5–4 win over Eintracht Frankfurt. In the following match against VfL Wolfsburg, Niedermeier sustained a thigh injury that sidelined him for a month. He returned to the starting line-up on 13 December in a 1–1 draw against Mainz 05, but was sent off three days later in the 53rd minute for unsportsmanlike conduct during a 1–0 win over Hamburger SV. After serving a one-match suspension, he returned on 31 January 2015 in a 1–0 loss against Borussia Mönchengladbach. From that point on, Niedermeier regained a regular place in the starting eleven, playing as a central defender for the remainder of the season. On 20 February 2015, in a match against Borussia Dortmund, he captained the side, scored his first goal of the season, and assisted the team's opening goal in a 3–2 loss.

Stuttgart finished 14th in the Bundesliga, narrowly avoiding relegation once again. Niedermeier made 22 appearances in all competitions and scored one goal.

==== 2015–16 season ====
Under new head coach Alexander Zorniger, Niedermeier once again found himself behind in the pecking order at the start of the 2015–16 Bundesliga season. He began the campaign on the bench and despite continuing to train with full commitment, he did not make an appearance under Zorniger, who was dismissed in November 2015 following a poor run of results. He made his first appearance of the season on 29 November 2015 against Borussia Dortmund, starting the entire match and scoring an own goal in a 4–1 defeat — the first of his career. On 16 December, he scored his first goal of the season in a 3–2 win over Eintracht Braunschweig in the DFB-Pokal. From that point on, he regained a regular place in the starting line-up for the remainder of the season. He then scored his second goal of the campaign and assisted the team's third in a 4–2 win against Eintracht Frankfurt on 6 February 2016. On 5 March, Niedermeier scored twice in a 5–1 win over TSG 1899 Hoffenheim. Following a one-match suspension, he returned to the starting XI against Bayern Munich on 9 April and inadvertently scored a second own goal of the season in a 3–1 defeat. He captained the side once again on 2 May in a 6–2 loss to Werder Bremen.

Despite a brief upturn in form following the coaching change, Stuttgart were relegated after a turbulent season, culminating in a 3–1 loss to VfL Wolfsburg on 14 May 2016. Niedermeier made 20 appearances in all competitions and scored four goals.

It was announced on 30 May 2016 that Niedermeier would leave the club after the expiration of his contract. Prior to his departure, Stuttgarter Zeitung published an article debating whether he deserved a contract extension, noting his popularity among supporters.

=== SC Freiburg (2016–2018) ===
On 30 August 2016, Niedermeier signed a two-year contract with Bundesliga club SC Freiburg.

He made his 2016–17 Bundesliga debut for Freiburg on 16 September 2016 as a substitute in a 3–0 loss to 1. FC Köln and made several more starts early in the season. In October 2016, he sustained a long-term back injury that sidelined him for the remainder of the calendar year.

Freiburg finished seventh in the Bundesliga that season, qualifying for the UEFA Europa League play-off round. Niedermeier made seven appearances in all competitions during the 2016–17 campaign.

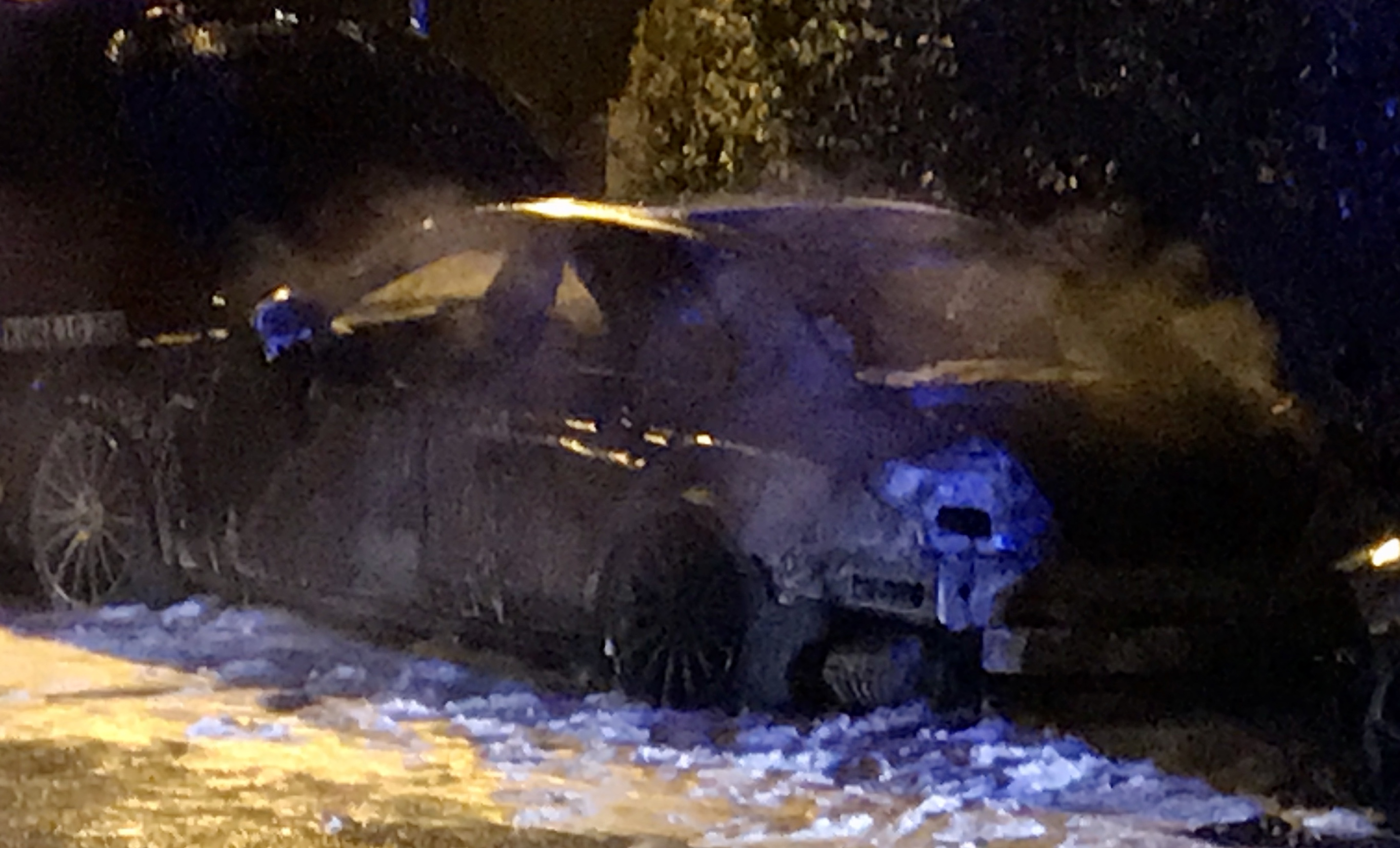
Picture shows the aftermath of Niedermeier's car set on fire in 2017.

Ahead of the following season, a proposed move to 2. Bundesliga side Union Berlin fell through shortly before the transfer deadline. Niedermeier, whose contract ran through June 2018, was no longer part of the first-team squad after the winter break and instead featured for SC Freiburg II in the Regionalliga Südwest. He did not make any senior appearances during the 2017–18 season but played four matches and scored one goal for the reserves. Freiburg finished 15th in the Bundesliga that season, narrowly avoiding relegation.

In November 2017, his parked Mercedes-AMG was destroyed in a suspected arson attack outside his home in Freiburg. Niedermeier left the club at the end of the 2017–18 season upon the expiration of his contract.

=== Melbourne Victory (2018–2019) ===
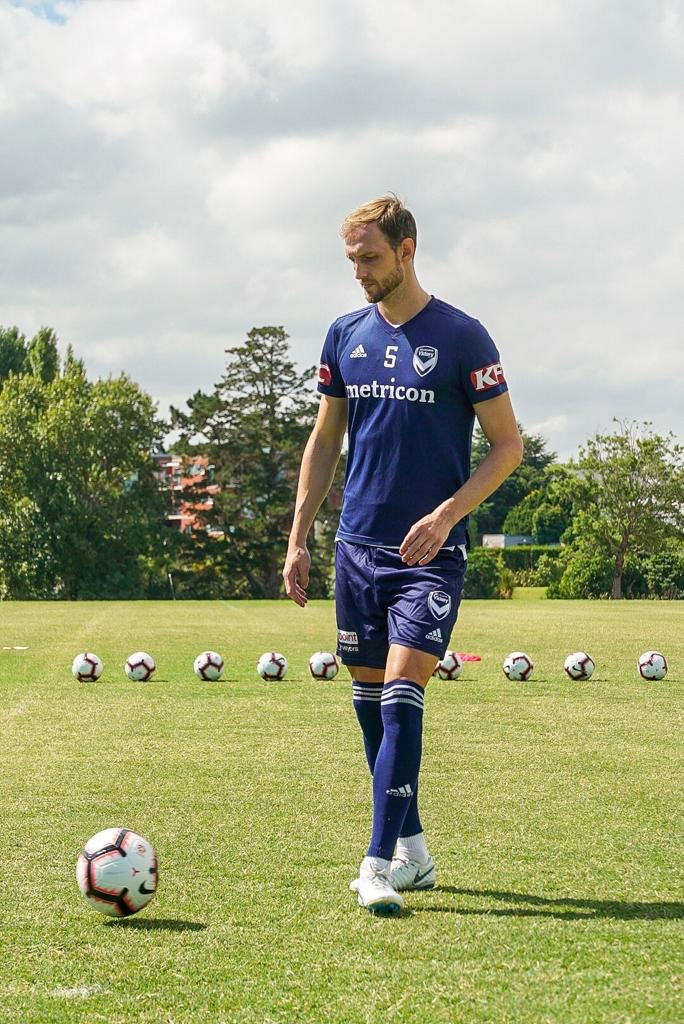
Niedermeier training with Melbourne Victory

On 24 July 2018, Niedermeier signed with A-League club Melbourne Victory, joining fellow European recruits Keisuke Honda, Ola Toivonen, and Raúl Baena.

Niedermeier made his A-League debut on 20 October 2018 in a 2–1 loss to Melbourne City in the opening round of the 2018–19 season. After having started the next four matches he sustained two concussions and a mid-foot ligament sprain in the following weeks, limiting his availability. On 14 April 2019, Niedermeier scored his first A-League goal — the match-winner in a 2–1 victory over Central Coast Mariners — securing Melbourne Victory's place in the Finals Series. Melbourne finished third in the regular season and progressed to the Elimination Final, where Niedermeier scored the opening goal in a 3–1 win over Wellington Phoenix at AAMI Park on 3 May 2019. The team's campaign ended in the Semi-Finals with a defeat to Sydney FC at Jubilee Oval.

Niedermeier made 19 appearances in all competitions and scored two goals during the 2018–19 campaign. On 28 May 2019, Melbourne Victory announced his departure from the club. He subsequently returned to Germany to train with Bayern Munich II while pursuing a new contract.

=== New Plymouth Rangers (2023) ===
On 7 April 2023, Niedermeier was announced as part of the New Plymouth Rangers squad to compete in the 2023 Taranaki Premiership.

== International career ==
Niedermeier represented Germany at youth level, earning 14 caps for the Under-17 national team and three caps for the Under-19 national team. He did not receive any senior national team call-ups.

== Style of Play ==
Niedermeier earned a reputation as a physically strong, old-fashioned centre-back, excelling in one-on-one duels and dominating in the air. His tough tackling, physical style earned him comparisons to Bayern Munich legend Katsche Schwarzenbeck, while his heading ability was honed from his youth as a forward. Standing at 1.90 m, he was a commanding presence in defensive challenges and a constant threat on set pieces, scoring numerous goals with headers over his career. His uncompromising style earned him the nickname “Niederstrecker”, a tongue-in-cheek moniker (derived from the German verb niederstrecken, “to knock down”) given by his teammates. The nickname, which roughly means “one who floors (opponents),” alluded to his wholehearted tackles and physical defending, and it was soon picked up by fans and media as a defining epithet. Despite the aggressive nickname, colleagues noted that Niedermeier was “kein Treter” – not a brutal hacker – but rather a tough yet fair competitor who rarely resorted to dirty play. He embraced the old-school stopper role with pride, once quipping that as a centre-back, “I don’t need to do fancy stepovers – I’ll leave that to the guys up front”, reflecting both his pragmatism and self-awareness of his playing style.

This rugged, defensive-first approach was at times described as antiquated, but it proved effective and appreciated: coaches valued his reliability and ability to fill defensive gaps when the team was under pressure. In 2015, for example, new coach Alexander Zorniger initially sidelined Niedermeier for not fitting a high-pressing system, but the player's camp and supporters defended his qualities, highlighting his strength in duels, aerial ability and exemplary professionalism. Former coach Bruno Labbadia had similarly praised Niedermeier as “strong in the tackle and in the air,” noting that he brought calmness to the back line and was important for the team.

Beyond his defensive skills, Niedermeier was respected as a leader and model professional. A product of Bayern Munich's youth academy from the age of nine, he spent roughly 15 years at Bayern (becoming captain of their reserve team) before joining VfB Stuttgart in 2009. Over seven and a half seasons in Stuttgart, he developed into a key dressing-room figure and a regular starter. He served on the club's team council and became vice-captain, valued for his vocal organization of the back line and his calm communication on the field. Stuttgart's sporting director Fredi Bobic lauded Niedermeier as a player who “leads by example with passion and commitment” and therefore an essential presence in the squad. Known for his down-to-earth and approachable personality, Niedermeier was regarded as a loyal team player who put the club first. He rarely complained when not selected – one report noted that he always remained committed through both the club's successes and struggles. These qualities, combined with his long tenure, made him a popular and trusted figure at Stuttgart, often looked to as a leader who could help hold the team together in difficult times.

== Personal life ==
Outside of football, Niedermeier has maintained close ties to his hometown of Munich. His family and lifelong friends all live in Munich, and he has joked that this circle of friends “consists only of Bayern fans”. At the same time, after spending over seven years with VfB Stuttgart, Niedermeier came to regard Stuttgart as a second home. Announcing his departure from VfB in 2016, he told supporters: “I will always remain a fan of VfB Stuttgart and will keep the city, the club and of course all of you in my heart” emphasizing the strong personal bond he formed with the club and its fans.

Niedermeier has been characterized by teammates and journalists as a humble, grounded individual. He was described as “äußerst sympathisch, ruhig und bescheiden” (“extremely likable, quiet and modest”). Even when he was not in the starting lineup, he conducted himself with professionalism and without resentment. In 2015, local media dubbed him “Notnagel ohne Groll” – literally “emergency nail without resentment” – highlighting that he was the go-to stand-in who bore no grudge about his role. Niedermeier himself seldom sought the spotlight or transfers to bigger clubs. When asked about potential moves to England or Spain, the down-to-earth Bavarian insisted he had no such ambitions, saying, “I have extended my contract until 2016 – that’s statement enough”, to affirm his commitment to Stuttgart. This modest, team-first attitude made him a popular figure with supporters and earned him a reputation as a model professional throughout his career.

After concluding his playing career, Niedermeier pursued further education in football. In 2023, he undertook coaching courses in Australia (where he had spent the final year of his career) to prepare for life after playing. He successfully obtained his Football Australia “C” and “B” coaching licences through an intensive program run in conjunction with Professional Footballers Australia. Niedermeier's completion of these coaching qualifications – certified by the Australian football federation and players’ union – suggests that he is preparing for a future transition into coaching or a related role in the sport.

== Career statistics ==
Appearances and goals by club, season and competition
Club	Season	League			Cup		Continental		Total	
Club	Season	Division	Apps	Goals	Apps	Goals	Apps	Goals	Apps	Goals
Bayern Munich II	2003–04	Regionalliga Süd	1	0	—		—		1	0
Bayern Munich II	2004–05	Regionalliga Süd	4	0	0	0	—		4	0
Bayern Munich II	2005–06	Regionalliga Süd	28	0	—		—		28	0
Bayern Munich II	2006–07	Regionalliga Süd	15	0	—		—		15	0
Bayern Munich II	2007–08	Regionalliga Süd	20	0	—		—		20	0
Bayern Munich II	2008–09	3. Liga	18	0	—		—		18	0
Bayern Munich II	Total		86	0	0	0	—		86	0
VfB Stuttgart	2008–09	Bundesliga	5	0	0	0	0	0	5	0
VfB Stuttgart	2009–10	Bundesliga	12	1	0	0	2	0	14	1
VfB Stuttgart	2010–11	Bundesliga	29	5	2	0	11	0	42	5
VfB Stuttgart	2011–12	Bundesliga	17	0	2	0	—		19	0
VfB Stuttgart	2012–13	Bundesliga	27	1	6	0	7	1	40	2
VfB Stuttgart	2013–14	Bundesliga	18	1	1	0	1	0	20	0
VfB Stuttgart	2014–15	Bundesliga	22	1	0	0	—		22	1
VfB Stuttgart	2015–16	Bundesliga	17	3	2	1	—		19	4
VfB Stuttgart	Total		148	12	13	1	21	1	182	14
SC Freiburg	2016–17	Bundesliga	6	0	1	0	0	0	7	0
SC Freiburg II	2017–18	Regionalliga Südwest	4	1	0	0	0	0	4	1
Melbourne Victory	2018–19	A-League	19	2					19	2
New Plymouth Rangers	2022–23	Central League	7	1	1	1				
Career total			270	16	15	2	21	1	306	19

== Honours ==
Bayern Munich Youth

- Winner U19-Bundesliga: 2004

Bayern Munich II

- Winner 3.Division/Regionalliga Südwest: 2004
- Winner IFA Shield: 2005

VfB Stuttgart

- DFB-Pokal Finalist: 2013
