= 2014–15 VfB Stuttgart season =

VfB Stuttgart
2014–15 season
- Manager: Huub Stevens
- Bundesliga: 14th
- DFB-Pokal: First round
- Top goalscorer: Martin Harnik (8)
- Highest home attendance: 60,000
Home colours	Away colours	Third colours

The 2014–15 VfB Stuttgart season was the 122nd season in the club's history. In the previous season, Stuttgart finished just five points ahead of the relegation zone.

== First team squad ==
The club's current squad:

Note: Flags indicate national team as defined under FIFA eligibility rules; some limited exceptions apply. Players may hold more than one non-FIFA nationality.

No.	Pos.	Nation	Player
1	GK	GER	Sven Ulreich
2	DF	JPN	Gōtoku Sakai
3	DF	GER	Daniel Schwaab
5	DF	TUN	Karim Haggui
6	DF	GER	Georg Niedermeier
7	FW	AUT	Martin Harnik
8	MF	GER	Moritz Leitner (on loan from Borussia Dortmund)
9	FW	BIH	Vedad Ibišević
10	MF	GER	Daniel Didavi
11	MF	ECU	Carlos Gruezo
13	MF	ESP	Oriol Romeu (on loan from Chelsea)
16	DF	AUT	Florian Klein
17	GK	GRE	Odisseas Vlachodimos
18	MF	SRB	Filip Kostić

No.	Pos.	Nation	Player
19	FW	GER	Timo Werner
20	MF	GER	Christian Gentner (captain)
21	MF	CZE	Adam Hloušek
22	GK	GER	Thorsten Kirschbaum
23	MF	TUR	Sercan Sararer
24	DF	GER	Antonio Rüdiger
25	FW	NOR	Mohammed Abdellaoue
26	MF	AUT	Raphael Holzhauser
27	DF	GER	Tim Leibold
33	FW	GER	Daniel Ginczek
34	DF	GER	Konstantin Rausch
39	MF	GER	Robin Yalçın
44	MF	ROU	Alexandru Maxim

== Players out on loan ==
Note: Flags indicate national team as defined under FIFA eligibility rules; some limited exceptions apply. Players may hold more than one non-FIFA nationality.

No.	Pos.	Nation	Player
14	MF	NZL	Marco Rojas (at Greuther Fürth until June 2015)
—	MF	AUT	Kevin Stöger (at 1. FC Kaiserslautern until June 2015)

No.	Pos.	Nation	Player
—	GK	SRB	Rastko Šuljagić (at Dnipro Dnipropetrovsk until June 2015)

== Transfers ==
=== In ===
Note: Flags indicate national team as defined under FIFA eligibility rules; some limited exceptions apply. Players may hold more than one non-FIFA nationality.

No.	Pos.	Nation	Player
13	MF	ESP	Oriol Romeu (from Chelsea)
16	DF	AUT	Florian Klein (from Red Bull Salzburg)
18	MF	SRB	Filip Kostić (from Groningen)
21	MF	CZE	Adam Hloušek (from 1. FC Nürnberg)
33	FW	GER	Daniel Ginczek (from 1. FC Nürnberg)

=== Out ===
Note: Flags indicate national team as defined under FIFA eligibility rules; some limited exceptions apply. Players may hold more than one non-FIFA nationality.

No.	Pos.	Nation	Player
—	DF	CIV	Arthur Boka (at Málaga)
—	MF	GER	Rani Khedira (at RB Leipzig)
—	MF	GUI	Ibrahima Traoré (at Borussia Mönchengladbach)
—	MF	FRA	Johan Audel (at Nantes)
—	MF	DEN	William Kvist (at Wigan Athletic)
—	FW	GER	Cacau (at Cerezo Osaka)

== Competitions ==
=== Bundesliga ===
==== League table ====
Pos	Team	Pld	W	D	L	GF	GA	GD	Pts	Qualification or relegation
12	1. FC Köln	34	9	13	12	34	40	−6	40	
13	Hannover 96	34	9	10	15	40	56	−16	37	
14	VfB Stuttgart	34	9	9	16	42	60	−18	36	
15	Hertha BSC	34	9	8	17	36	52	−16	35	
16	Hamburger SV (O)	34	9	8	17	25	50	−25	35	Qualification for the relegation play-offs

Source: DFB
Rules for classification: 1) points; 2) goal difference; 3) number of goals scored
(O) Play-off winners

==== Results summary ====
Overall								Home						Away					
Pld	W	D	L	GF	GA	GD	Pts	W	D	L	GF	GA	GD	W	D	L	GF	GA	GD
34	9	9	16	42	60	−18	36	5	4	8	18	28	−10	4	5	8	24	32	−8

Last updated: 10 April 2017.

==== Results by round ====
Round	1	2	3	4	5	6	7	8	9	10	11	12	13	14	15	16	17	18	19	20	21	22	23	24	25	26	27	28	29	30	31	32	33	34
Ground	A	H	A	H	A	H	A	H	A	H	A	H	A	H	A	A	H	H	A	H	A	H	A	H	A	H	A	H	A	H	A	H	H	A
Result	D	L	L	L	D	W	L	D	W	L	L	L	W	L	D	W	D	L	D	L	L	L	D	D	L	W	L	W	L	D	L	W	W	W
Position	10	16	17	18	17	15	16	14	14	17	17	18	16	16	15	15	15	17	16	18	18	18	18	18	18	18	18	17	17	18	18	18	16	14

Updated to match(es) played on 9 May 2015. Source: Competitive matches
A = Away; H = Home; W = Win; D = Draw; L = Loss

==== Matches ====
24 August 2014 1	Borussia Mönchengladbach	1–1	VfB Stuttgart	Mönchengladbach
18:30 CEST (UTC+02:00)	Traoré (yellow card) 31'; Xhaka (yellow card) 76'; Kramer 90'	Report	Maxim 51'; Ibišević (yellow card) 64'	Stadium: Borussia-Park; Attendance: 50,203; Referee: Christian Dingert

30 August 2014 2	VfB Stuttgart	0–2	1. FC Köln	Stuttgart
15:30 CEST (UTC+02:00)	Kostić (yellow card) 86'	Report	Osako 22'; Ujah 33'; Risse (yellow card) 40'; Brečko (yellow card) 61'	Stadium: Mercedes-Benz Arena; Attendance: 55,000; Referee: Felix Brych

13 September 2014 3	Bayern Munich	2–0	VfB Stuttgart	Munich
15:30 CEST (UTC+02:00)	Götze 27'; Alonso (yellow card) 62'; Ribéry 85'	Report	Romeu (yellow card) 27'; Kostić (yellow card) 90+1'	Stadium: Allianz Arena; Attendance: 71,000; Referee: Thorsten Kinhöfer

20 August 2014 4	VfB Stuttgart	0–2	1899 Hoffenheim	Stuttgart
15:30 CEST (UTC+02:00)		Report	Modeste 15'; Rudy (yellow card) 70'; Elyounoussi 84'; Schipplock (yellow card) 89'	Stadium: Mercedes-Benz Arena; Attendance: 44,000; Referee: Peter Sippel

24 September 2014 5	Borussia Dortmund	2–2	VfB Stuttgart	Dortmund
20:00 CEST (UTC+02:00)	Papastathopoulos (yellow card) 61'; Subotić (yellow card) 81'; Aubameyang 73'; Immobile 86'	Report	Didavi 48', 68'; Romeu (yellow card) 64'; Gentner (yellow card) 85'	Stadium: Westfalenstadion; Attendance: 79,000; Referee: Manuel Gräfe

27 September 2014 6	VfB Stuttgart	1–0	Hannover 96	Stuttgart
15:30 CEST (UTC+02:00)	Gentner (yellow card) 57'; Schwaab 69'; Leitner (yellow card) 75'; Kostić (yellow card) 90'	Report	Gülselam (yellow card) 44'; Bittencourt (yellow card) 86'	Stadium: Mercedes-Benz Arena; Attendance: 40,500; Referee: Günter Perl

3 October 2014 7	Hertha BSC	3–2	VfB Stuttgart	Berlin
18:30 CEST (UTC+02:00)	Kalou 22' (pen.), 64'; Heitinga (yellow card) 43'; Beerens 74'; Pekarík (yellow card) 83'	Report	Leitner 5', (yellow card) 30'; Ibišević (yellow card) 82'; Wagner 83' (o.g.)	Stadium: Olympiastadion; Attendance: 46,312; Referee: Deniz Aytekin

18 October 2014 8	VfB Stuttgart	3–3	Bayer Leverkusen	Stuttgart
15:30 CEST (UTC+02:00)	Leitner (yellow card) 27'; Werner 57'; Klein 67'; Niedermeier (yellow card) 73'; Harnik 76'; Gentner (yellow card) 86'	Report	Son 4', 9'; Hilbert (yellow card) 24'; Bellarabi 41'; Toprak (yellow card) 83'	Stadium: Mercedes-Benz Arena; Attendance: 40,900; Referee: Felix Zwayer

25 October 2014 9	Eintracht Frankfurt	4–5	VfB Stuttgart	Frankfurt
15:30 CEST (UTC+02:00)	Madlung 21', 65'; Anderson Bamba (yellow card) 49'; Stendera (yellow card) 54'; Meier 57'; Aigner 61', (yellow card) 85'; Oczipka (yellow card) 83'; Russ (yellow card) 86'; Seferovic (red card) 86'	Report	Harnik 34', 36'; Gentner 51', 84'; Rüdiger (yellow card) 70'; Niedermeier (yellow card) 76'; Werner 81'; Romeu (yellow card) 83'	Stadium: Commerzbank-Arena; Attendance: 49,700; Referee: Christian Dingert

1 November 2014 10	VfB Stuttgart	0–4	VfL Wolfsburg	Stuttgart
15:30 CET (UTC+01:00)	Sararer (yellow card) 28'	Report	Perišić 15', 88'; Knoche 45+1'; De Bruyne 48'	Stadium: Mercedes-Benz Arena; Attendance: 50,050; Referee: Bastian Dankert

8 November 2014 11	Werder Bremen	2–0	VfB Stuttgart	Bremen
18:30 CET (UTC+01:00)	Prödl 30'; Bartels 57'; Obraniak (yellow card) 90+2'	Report	Romeu (yellow card) 31'	Stadium: Weserstadion; Attendance: 40,284; Referee: Guido Winkmann

23 November 2014 12	VfB Stuttgart	0–1	FC Augsburg	Stuttgart
17:30 CET (UTC+01:00)	Schwaab (yellow card) 21' (yellow-red card) 27'; Romeu (yellow card) 52'; Leitner (yellow card) 64'	Report	Werner (yellow card) 31'; Feulner (yellow card) 58'; Verhaegh 72' (pen.), (yellow card) 75'	Stadium: Mercedes-Benz Arena; Attendance: 48,200; Referee: Thorsten Kinhöfer

28 November 2014 13	SC Freiburg	1–4	VfB Stuttgart	Freiburg im Breisgau
20:30 CET (UTC+01:00)	Darida 42'; Mitrović (red card) 70'; Mehmedi (yellow card) 71'; Höfler (yellow card) 90+2'	Report	Gruezo (yellow card) 19', (goal) 52'; Harnik 31', 76'; Werner 68'	Stadium: Dreisamstadion; Attendance: 24,000; Referee: Manuel Gräfe

6 December 2014 14	VfB Stuttgart	0–4	Schalke 04	Stuttgart
15:30 CET (UTC+01:00)		Report	Choupo-Moting 1', 21', 61'; Meyer 10'	Stadium: Mercedes-Benz Arena; Attendance: 44,700; Referee: Florian Meyer

13 December 2014 15	Mainz 05	1–1	VfB Stuttgart	Mainz
18:30 CET (UTC+01:00)	Geis 36'; Jairo (yellow card) 56'; Đuričić (yellow card) 89'	Report	Hloušek (yellow card) 45+1'; Ginczek (yellow card) 58'; Kostić 72'	Stadium: Coface Arena; Attendance: 29,279; Referee: Bastian Dankert

16 December 2014 16	Hamburger SV	0–1	VfB Stuttgart	Hamburg
20:00 CET (UTC+01:00)	Van der Vaart (yellow card) 66'	Report	Klein 42'; Niedermeier (red card) 53'; Harnik (yellow card) 66'; Hloušek (yellow card) 77'	Stadium: Volksparkstadion; Attendance: 48,223; Referee: Felix Brych

20 December 2014 17	VfB Stuttgart	0–0	SC Paderborn	Stuttgart
15:30 CET (UTC+01:00)	Didavi (yellow card) 61'	Report	Vrančić (yellow card) 6'; Stoppelkamp (yellow card) 16'; Rupp (yellow card) 42'	Stadium: Mercedes-Benz Arena; Attendance: 55,000; Referee: Tobias Stieler

31 January 2015 18	VfB Stuttgart	0–1	Borussia Mönchengladbach	Stuttgart
15:30 CET (UTC+01:00)	Gentner (yellow card) 33'; Niedermeier (yellow card) 50'; Kostić (yellow card) 79'	Report	Xhaka (yellow card) 33'; Hermann 71'; Korb (yellow card) 81'	Stadium: Mercedes-Benz Arena; Attendance: 46,200; Referee: Christian Dingert

4 February 2015 19	1. FC Köln	0–0	VfB Stuttgart	Cologne
20:00 CET (UTC+01:00)	Gerhardt (yellow card) 73'; Maroh (yellow card) 73'	Report		Stadium: RheinEnergieStadion; Attendance: 48,400; Referee: Tobias Stieler

7 February 2015 20	VfB Stuttgart	0–2	Bayern Munich	Stuttgart
15:30 CET (UTC+01:00)	Romeu (yellow card) 49'	Report	Robben 41'; Alaba 50'; Benatia (yellow card) 86'	Stadium: Mercedes-Benz Arena; Attendance: 60,000; Referee: Florian Meyer

14 February 2015 21	1899 Hoffenheim	2–1	VfB Stuttgart	Sinsheim
15:30 CET (UTC+01:00)	Schwegler (yellow card) 9'; Schipplock (yellow card) 25'; Firmino 30'; Abraham (yellow card) 61'; Rudy 90+3'	Report	Werner (yellow card) 35'; Sakai 39'; Niedermeier (yellow card) 43'; Gentner (yellow card) 79'	Stadium: Rhein-Neckar Arena; Attendance: 29,309; Referee: Tobias Welz

20 February 2015 22	VfB Stuttgart	2–3	Borussia Dortmund	Stuttgart
20:30 CET (UTC+01:00)	Klein 32'; Die (yellow card) 84'; Niedermeier 90+1'	Report	Kagawa (yellow card) 8'; Aubameyang 25'; Gündoğan 39'; Piszczek (yellow card) 75'; Reus 89'	Stadium: Mercedes-Benz Arena; Attendance: 60,000; Referee: Deniz Aytekin

28 February 2015 23	Hannover 96	1–1	VfB Stuttgart	Hanover
15:30 CET (UTC+01:00)	Prib (yellow card) 30'; Stindl 70', (yellow card) 89' (yellow-red card) 90'; Joselu (yellow card) 90+1'	Report	Gentner 52'; Ginczek (yellow card) 54'; Kirschbaum (yellow card) 86'; Harnik (red card) 90'	Stadium: Niedersachsenstadion; Attendance: 40,200; Referee: Wolfgang Stark

6 March 2015 24	VfB Stuttgart	0–0	Hertha BSC	Stuttgart
20:30 CET (UTC+01:00)	Klein (yellow card) 32'; Leitner (yellow card) 90+2'	Report	Heitinga (yellow card) 1'; Kraft (yellow card) 55'; Schulz (yellow card) 74' (yellow-red card) 90+7'	Stadium: Mercedes-Benz Arena; Attendance: 45,420; Referee: Felix Brych

13 March 2015 25	Bayer Leverkusen	4–0	VfB Stuttgart	Leverkusen
20:30 CET (UTC+01:00)	Hilbert (yellow card) 27'; Wendell 32', (yellow card) 35'; Drmić 36', 59'; Çalhanoğlu (yellow card) 48'; Bellarabi 50'	Report	Die (yellow card) 60'; Maxim (yellow card) 74'; Hloušek (yellow card) 84'	Stadium: BayArena; Attendance: 29,384; Referee: Tobias Stieler

21 March 2015 26	VfB Stuttgart	3–1	Eintracht Frankfurt	Stuttgart
15:30 CET (UTC+01:00)	Die (yellow card) 42'; Ginczek 63', 66'; Maxim 80', (yellow card) 81'	Report	Seferovic 51', (yellow card) 68'; Madlung (yellow card) 84'	Stadium: Mercedes-Benz Arena; Attendance: 48,500; Referee: Jochen Drees

4 April 2015 27	VfL Wolfsburg	3–1	VfB Stuttgart	Wolfsburg
15:30 CEST (UTC+02:00)	Rodríguez 41' (pen.), 65'; Luiz Gustavo (yellow card) 75'; Schürrle 76'	Report	Harnik 44'; Die (yellow card) 55'; Romeu (yellow card) 64'	Stadium: Volkswagen Arena; Attendance: 30,000; Referee: Tobias Welz

12 April 2015 28	VfB Stuttgart	3–2	Werder Bremen	Stuttgart
17:30 CEST (UTC+02:00)	Gentner 15'; Rüdiger (yellow card) 16'; Ginczek 70', 90+1'; Harnik (yellow card) 73' (yellow-red card) 84'	Report	Di Santo (yellow card) 16'; Selke 50', (yellow card) 90'; Bargfrede (yellow card) 52'; Vestergaard 86'	Stadium: Mercedes-Benz Arena; Attendance: 51,400; Referee: Günter Perl

18 April 2015 29	FC Augsburg	2–1	VfB Stuttgart	Augsburg
18:30 CEST (UTC+02:00)	Werner 7'; Bobadilla 73'; Feulner (yellow card) 83'; Baba (yellow card) 83'	Report	Ginczek 22'; Hloušek (yellow card) 36'; Die (yellow card) 40'; Schwaab (yellow card) 67'; Maxim (yellow card) 83'	Stadium: SGL arena Attendance: 30,660; Referee: Thorsten Kinhöfer

25 April 2015 30	VfB Stuttgart	2–2	SC Freiburg	Stuttgart
15:30 CEST (UTC+02:00)	Baumgartl (yellow card) 7'; Ginczek 24'; Harnik 27'; Hloušek (yellow card) 58' (yellow-red card) 66'; Gentner (yellow card) 89'	Report	Mitrović (yellow card) 32'; Petersen 58' (pen.), 85'; Schuster (yellow card) 89'	Stadium: Mercedes-Benz Arena; Attendance: 58,000; Referee: Wolfgang Stark

2 May 2015 31	Schalke 04	3–2	VfB Stuttgart	Gelsenkirchen
15:30 CEST (UTC+02:00)	Huntelaar 9', 78', (yellow card) 80'; Klein 89' (o.g.)	Report	Harnik 22'; Kostić 51'	Stadium: Veltins-Arena; Attendance: 61,973; Referee: Felix Zwayer

9 May 2015 32	VfB Stuttgart	2–0	Mainz 05	Stuttgart
18:30 CEST (UTC+02:00)	Klein (yellow card) 3'; Didavi 66', (yellow card) 68'; Kostić 78'	Report	Noveski (yellow card) 14'	Stadium: Mercedes-Benz Arena; Attendance: 54,300; Referee: Michael Weiner

16 May 2015 33	VfB Stuttgart	2–1	Hamburger SV	Stuttgart
15:30 CEST (UTC+02:00)	Gentner 27'; Harnik 35'; Didavi (yellow card) 69'	Report	Kačar 12', (yellow card) 69'; Adler (yellow card) 56'; Olić (yellow card) 58'; Van der Vaart (yellow card) 90+3'; Westermann (yellow card) 90+4'	Stadium: Mercedes-Benz Arena; Attendance: 60,000; Referee: Manuel Gräfe

23 May 2015 34	SC Paderborn	1–2	VfB Stuttgart	Paderborn
15:30 CEST (UTC+02:00)	Vucinovic 4'; Stoppelkamp (yellow card) 77'; Lakić (yellow card) 85'	Report	Didavi 36'; Ginczek 72', (yellow card) 79'; Kostić (yellow card) 90+2'	Stadium: Benteler Arena; Attendance: 15,000; Referee: Deniz Aytekin

=== DFB-Pokal ===
16 August 2014 Round 1	VfL Bochum	2–0	VfB Stuttgart	Bochum
15:30 CEST (UTC+02:00)	Terodde 9', 48'; Šimůnek (yellow card) 24'	Report	Gentner (yellow card) 43'; Romeu (yellow card) 45+1'	Stadium: Ruhrstadion; Attendance: 22,694; Referee: Wolfgang Stark
