= Serdar Tasci =

German association football player (born 1987)

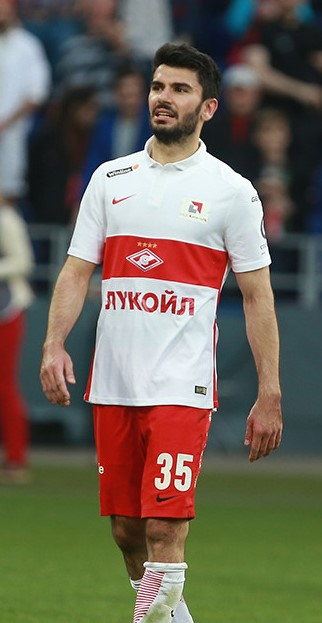
- Tasci playing for Spartak Moscow in 2017

Personal information
- Full name: Serdar Tasci
- Date of birth: 24 April 1987 (age 39)
- Place of birth: Esslingen, West Germany
- Height: 1.86 m (6 ft 1 in)
- Position: Centre-back

Youth career
- 1993–1997: SC Altbach
- 1997–1999: Stuttgarter Kickers
- 1999–2005: VfB Stuttgart

Senior career*
Years	Team	Apps	(Gls)
2005–2006	VfB Stuttgart II	30	(2)
2006–2013	VfB Stuttgart	181	(9)
2013–2018	Spartak Moscow	74	(2)
2016	→ Bayern Munich (loan)	3	(0)
2019	İstanbul Başakşehir	4	(0)
Total		292	(13)

International career
2006	Germany U19	3	(0)
2007	Germany U20	1	(0)
2007	Germany U21	1	(0)
2008–2010	Germany	14	(0)
- * Club domestic league appearances and goals

Serdar Tasci (Turkish: Serdar Taşçı; German: [ˈzɛʁdaʁ ˈtaskiː]; born 24 April 1987) is a German former professional footballer who played as a centre-back.

Tasci started his career with VfB Stuttgart in 2006, playing with the club until 2013, captaining the side from 2011, making 181 senior appearances, and helping VfB win the 2006–07 Bundesliga. An injury in his first season at new club, Spartak Moscow, kept him out of action for a large part of the 2013–14 season. He was capped 14 times for Germany from 2008 to 2010, including the 2010 FIFA World Cup, at which Germany came third.

== Club career ==
=== VfB Stuttgart ===
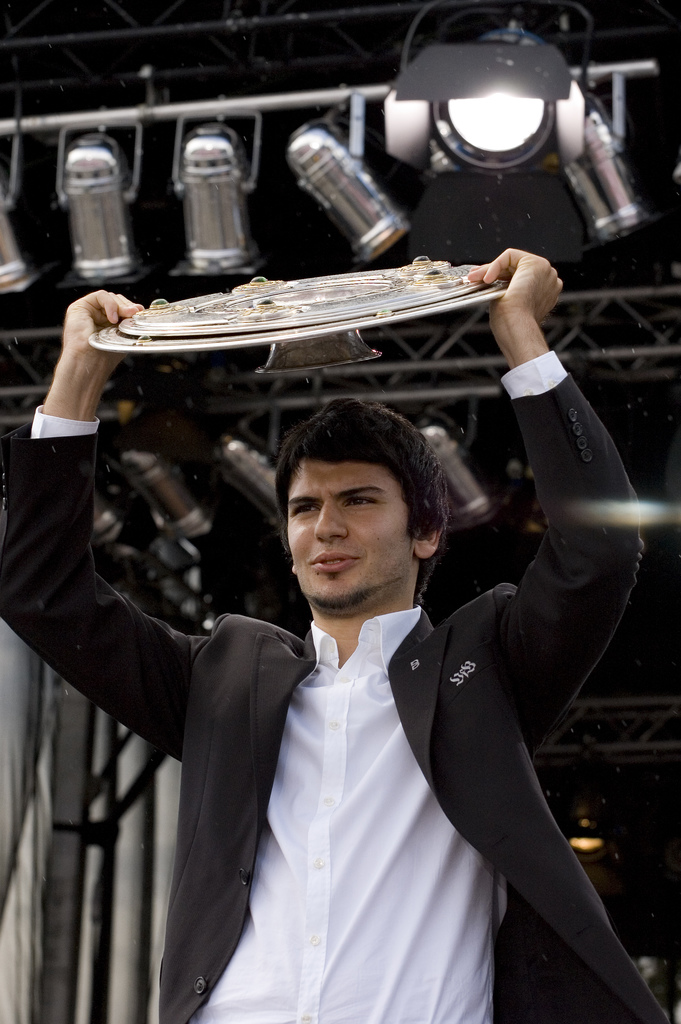
Tasci with the Meisterschale, the German championship trophy

Tasci was born in Esslingen, Baden-Württemberg, Germany, to Turkish parents from Artvin. He started playing football when he was six; he then played for the youth teams of SC Altbach, Stuttgarter Kickers and VfB Stuttgart. Before the 2005–06 season, he joined Stuttgart's second team, playing in the Regionalliga (third division), after helping the VfB to win the German B-Junior Championship (2004) and German A-Junior Championship (2005) ahead of his senior career.

Ahead of the 2006–07 season, Tasci was promoted to the club's Bundesliga side. After being included as an unused substitute in a match against 1. FC Nürnberg, Tasci had his professional debut against Arminia Bielefeld on 20 August 2006; the match—the second of the season—was a 3–2 win in which Tasci was substituted for injured Danish striker Jon Dahl Tomasson in the 68th minute. His first goal followed a week later in a game against Borussia Dortmund in a 1–3 defeat. His second goal of the season came on 29 October 2006, in a 3–0 win over Schalke 04. Shortly after, Tasci signed a contract that ran until 2010 with the club. Throughout the 2006–07 season, Tasci received a handful of first team appearances, playing in either the right–back and centre–back positions for the side. However, he was soon plagued with suspension following his sending–off, in a 4–1 loss against 1. FC Nürnberg on 27 January 2007 and injuries. Despite this, Tasci helped VfB Stuttgart beat Energie Cottbus to win 2–1 and claim their first Bundesliga title in 15 years in the last game of the season. However, in the final of the DFB-Pokal, he came on for Sami Khedira in extra time when Stuttgart lost 3–2 to Nürnberg. Reflecting about Tasci's season, Manager Armin Veh said of his involvement with the club: "He is a big surprise and with his 20 years plays well beyond his years." At the end of the 2006–07 season, Tasci had made thirty–one appearances and scoring two times in all competitions.

In the 2007–08 season, Tasci made a strong performance against Schalke in the opening game; kicker described his performance as clever and cool. He continued to regain his first team place for the side. Tasci then made his Champions League debut on matchday one, as Stuttgart lost 2–1 to Rangers. He scored his first goal of the season in a 4–1 loss against Hamburger SV on 20 October 2007. At the end of the 2007–08 season, Tasci made twenty–nine appearances and scoring once in all competitions; most of which he missed were due to injuries.

In the 2008–09 season, Tasci was paired with Khalid Boulahrouz in the centre-back position at the start of the season. In the qualification round of the UEFA Cup against Hungarian side Győri ETO, he scored his first European goal in a 2–1 victory, taking his club to the next round. In December 2008, his manager and mentor Armin Veh was sacked following the club's run of defeats. On 4 April 2009, Tasci scored his first league goal of the season in a 2–1 win over VfL Bochum. He missed the rest of the season after injuring his knee in a 2–0 loss against Eintracht Frankfurt on 25 April 2009. As a result, he was required to have surgery but decided not to have it, ending his 2008–09 season. At the end of the 2008–09 season, Tasci went on to make forty appearances and scoring two times in all competitions.

At the start of the 2009–10 season, Tasci made his return to the first team from injury, starting the whole game, in a 2–0 loss against VfL Wolfsburg. In a follow–up match against SC Freiburg, Tasci captained the side for the first time, as he helped Stuttgart beat them 4–2. On 29 August 2009, Tasci extended his contract with Stuttgart until the summer of 2014. As a result, buy-out clause was included as part of signing a new contract. It came after when Tasci was in a contract negotiation with the club. In his first half of the season, Tasci captained two more matches in the absence of Thomas Hitzlsperger. He scored his first Champions League goal as Stuttgart drew 1–1 with Romanian side Unirea Urziceni in the group stage matchday two on 29 September 2009. By November, however, he sustained "a stress fracture in his foot" that could have put him out for the remainder of the season. But he recovered after a few weeks and returned to the first team against Bayer Leverkusen on 29 November 2018, which was then followed–up by scoring his first goal of the Bundesliga season, in a 1–1 draw against VfL Bochum. Following Hitzlsperger removal of captaincy, Tasci was reportedly furious over not being chosen as a vice-captain. On 12 March 2010, he scored his second league goal of the season, in a 2–1 loss against Schalke 04. A week later on 19 March 2010, Tasci was declared injured as he suffered an adductor problem. Shortly after declaring fit and returning as an unused substitute in a match against Bayern Munich, Tasci returned to the starting lineup against Borussia Mönchengladbach on 3 April 2010, starting the whole game, in a 2–1 win. Later in the 2009–10 season, Tasci made thirty-eight appearances and scoring two times in all competition; having missed some matches, due to recurrence of injuries he sustained.

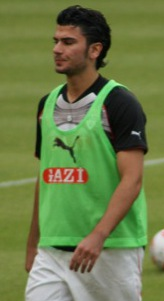
Tasci playing for Stuttgart in 2010

At the start of the 2010–11 season, Tasci attracted interest from clubs around Europe. Stuttgart's league rival Hamburger SV as well as foreign clubs such as Tottenham Hotspur and Juventus reportedly expressed their desire to sign him. This move was denied by his agent; he said that Tasci would stay at Stuttgart only. On 15 July 2010, Tasci expressed his desire to stay at the club. Tasci made his first appearance of the season, in a 3–2 loss against Borussia Dortmund. He scored his first goal for the club in the Europa League group stage matchday one in a 3–0 win over Young Boys. He then suffered a thigh problem that kept him out for a long time. In late November, Tasci returned to training with a bandage on his right knee. Once again, he was on the sideline after experiencing ongoing problems with his thigh injury despite reporting himself fit. He returned to the field on 19 December 2010 in the match against Bayern Munich, which Stuttgart lost 5–3. Following this, Tasci continued to regain his first team place for the rest of the 2010–11 season. At the end of the 2010–11 season, which he made thirty–two appearances and scoring once in all competitions, he continued to attract interest from Zenit Saint Petersburg, Tottenham Hotspur, Málaga and Arsenal.

In the 2011–12 season, Tasci continued to regain his first team place at the start of the season. Tasci scored his first goal of the season in a 3–0 win over Hannover 96 on 10 September. A month later, on 29 October 2011, he scored his second in a 1–1 draw against Borussia Dortmund. Halfway through the 2011–12 season, on 12 January 2012, he was appointed the new captain of VfB Stuttgart by Bruno Labbadia. Seven days before being appointed, Tasci and Cristian Molinaro were involved in an incident at training. Tasci's third goal came on 10 April 2012 in a 3–1 win over FC Augsburg. Despite suffering injuries during the 2011–12 seasonm Tasci went on to make thirty appearances and scoring three times in all competitions.

Ahead of the 2012–13 season, Tasci revealed that Spanish club Barcelona was interested in signing him. But in late July, he said that though he was linked with a move to Barcelona, Milan and Manchester City, the clubs had not officially approached him. This occurred as the club was making budget cuts, including the wages bill. Since the start of the 2012–13 season, Tasci remained as captain of Vfb Stuttgart once again. In late–September, he injured his achilles tendon that kept him out for several weeks. He returned to the starting lineup against Hamburger SV on 21 October 2012, which saw Stuttgart won 1–0. A month later, on 22 November 2012, he scored his first goal for the club in a Europa League 5–1 win over Steaua București to help the club progress to the knockout stage. On 1 December 2012, he received a straight red card for a serious foul play on Milorad Peković in a 1–0 victory over SpVgg Greuther Fürth. Later in April 2013, he was sidelined as he suffered from an achilles tendon rupture. It wasn't until on 11 May 2013 when he made his return to the starting lineup, starting the whole game as captain, in a 2–1 win over Schalke 04. In the DFB-Pokal final, he captained Stuttgart for the match, which the club lost 3–2 to Bayern Munich. At the end of the 2012–13 season, Tasci went on to make thirty–nine appearances and scoring once in all competitions.

Ahead of the 2013–14 season, Tasci said he was aiming to make progress to sign a new contract, having expressed a desire to prolong his contract to stay at Stuttgart, as he had one year left to his contract. At the start of the 2013–14 season, however, he sustained an injury during a match against Mainz 05 in the opening game of the season and was replaced by Konstantin Rausch. After the match, it was revealed that he had torn his lateral meniscus following his treatment, in what turned out to be his last appearance for VfB Stuttgart.

=== Spartak Moscow ===
==== 2013–2018 ====
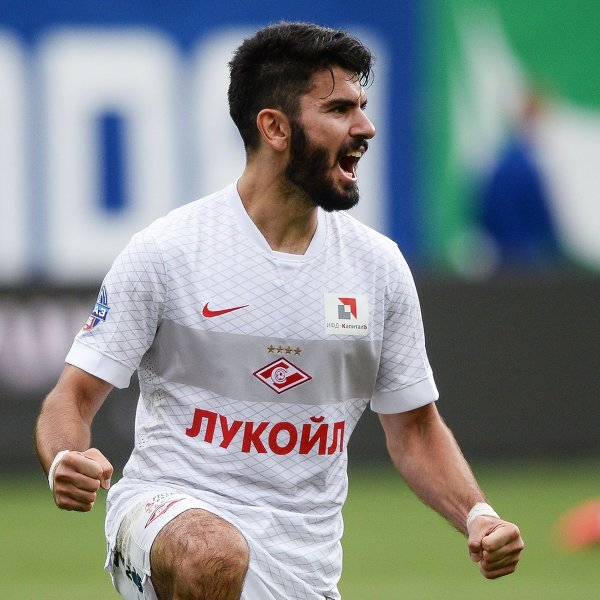
Tasci in action for Spartak Moscow against rivals' CSKA Moscow in 2014

On 30 August 2013, Tasci moved to Russian Premier League side Spartak Moscow for an undisclosed fee. Upon leaving Stuttgart, he told the press, "It was not an easy decision. The present decision is not a decision against VfB Stuttgart, but for the new task. I had an incredibly great time at VfB, have played in the youth here, then I turned pro and recently been the captain. I have always said that I am a VfBler and that I will remain."

Immediately after joining the club, his debut was delayed by the injuries he sustained while at Stuttgart. He made his first appearance with the club on 2 October 2013 when he appeared in training. After damaging his meniscus, however, Tasci's debut for Spartak Moscow was delayed further to January following an operation. He made his debut for the club on 17 March 2014 in a 2–2 draw against Anzhi Makhachkala. In April 2014, Izvestia reported that Tasci could be leaving Spartak Moscow, leading to interest from Turkish sides Fenerbahçe and Beşiktaş. Despite this, Tasci went on to make two more appearances in the 2013–14 season, adding his tally to three.

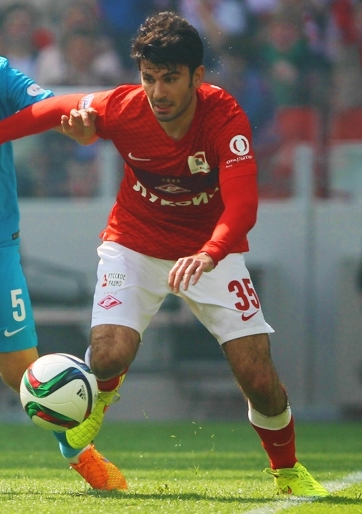
Tasci in action for Spartak Moscow against Zenit in 2015

In the 2014–15 season, under the new management of Murat Yakin, Tasci made his first appearance of the season against Dynamo Moscow on 10 August 2014, coming on as a substitute, as Spartak Moscow won 2–1. He then became a first team regular for Spartak Moscow. After suffered a calf injury in late–October, Tasci returned to the starting lineup and then scored his first Spartak goal on 2 November 2014, in a 3–3 draw against Kuban Krasnodar. Towards the end of the 2014–15 season, Tasci was reportedly offered a new contract by the club. However, this was denied by the club. Despite being sidelined further during the 2014–15 season, Tasci went on to make twenty–three appearances and scoring once in all competitions.

In the 2015–16 season, Tasci started the season well when he scored his first goal of the season, in a 2–2 draw against FC Ufa in the opening game of the season, and was named Team of the Week for his performance. In the next three matches, he helped the side win all the three matches with three clean sheets. A month later, his second goal for the side came on 23 September 2015, in a 7–0 win over Volga Nizhny Novgorod in the fifth round of the Russian Cup. Tasci then started in every match for the side since the start of the season. Despite being sidelined for one match in the first half of the 2015–16 season, Tasci went on to make seventeen appearances and scoring two times in all competitions.

In the 2016–17 season, Tasci returned to Spartak Moscow's first team after spending the second half of the previous season with Bayern Munich. He continued to regain his first team place at the start of te season, appearing in the first three league matches that saw Spartak Moscow make a good start. However, he soon found himself on the substitute bench in the number of matches. During a 2–1 win over Rubin Kazan on 5 December 2016, Tasci started the match and played until the 63rd minute when he suffered a knee injury. While on the sidelines, the January transfer window saw Tasci, once again, linked a move away from the club, with clubs, such as Trabzonspor, Southampton and Crystal Palace. But Tasci stayed at the club, stating that he wanted to help the club win the league, as they are the serious contender to win the league this season. By the end of February, he returned to full training after spending two months on the sidelines. Upon returning to the starting lineup, Tasci regained his first team place for the side for the rest of the season. In a 2–2 draw against FC Krasnodor on 5 March 2017, he scored an own goal to give the opposition team an equaliser. Eventually, he helped the side win the league after beating Tom Tomsk 1–0 win their first league title in fifteen years. Despite being sidelined on two occasions during the 2016–17 season, Tasci went on to make nineteen appearances in all competitions.

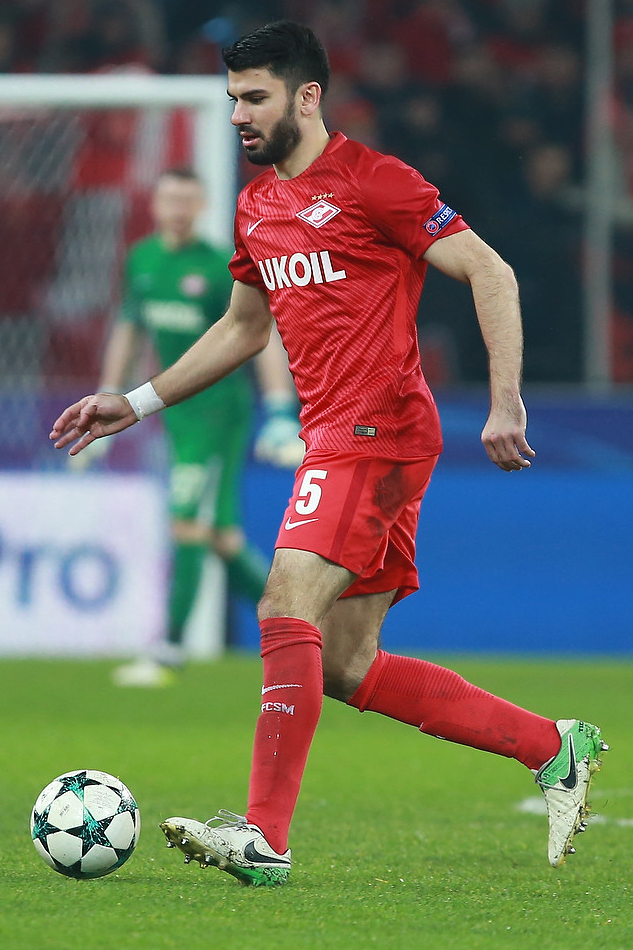
Tasci with Spartak Moscow in a Champions League match in 2017

Ahead of the 2017–18 season, however, Tasci suffered a toe injury during the club's pre–season training and sidelined at the start of the season. It wasn't until on 9 August 2017 when he made his return to the starting lineup and set up a goal for Zé Luís to score the second goal of the game, in a 2–0 win over Arsenal Tula. However, his return was short–lived after he suffered a thigh injury during a 0–0 draw against KA-Khabarovsk on 27 August 2017 and was sidelined for almost two weeks. But he made his return to the starting lineup on 17 September 2017, in a 2–2 draw against FC Tosno. After returning to the first team, Tasci continued to regain his place in the first team. By October, however, Russia media reported that Tasci rejected a new contract offer from the club. But in December 2017, he spoke about his future with the club and revealed the club is in the ongoing negotiation contract with him. However, on 22 February 2018 in the return leg against Athletic Bilbao in the round of 32 of the UEFA Europa League, he was substituted early in the first half after suffering a muscle injury and the injury resulted him sidelined for a month. Later in the 2017–18 season, Tasci lost his first team place at Spartak Moscow, due to further injuries and demotion to the substitute bench. Despite this, he finished the 2017–18 season, making twenty–two appearances in all competitions.

In March 2018, Tasci rejected a contract offer from Spartak Moscow once again and was expected to leave the club at the end of the 2017–18 season. It was later confirmed that he left Spartak upon the expiration of his contract on 30 June 2018.

==== Loan to Bayern Munich ====
Tasci was linked with a move to Turkish side Trabzonspor in the January transfer window at one point, with Douglas rumoured to be moving in the opposite direction, but the transaction never materialised. Tasci had stated himself that he was staying at Spartak Moscow. However, on 1 February 2016, he returned to the Bundesliga, signing for the title holders and league leaders Bayern Munich on loan for the rest of the season, amid an injury crisis in defence.

His sojourn at Bayern was immediately interrupted when Tasci suffered a concussion in training and was sidelined for weeks. He made his debut on 20 February, starting in a 3–1 home win over Darmstadt 98 at the Allianz Arena before being substituted after playing 53 minutes by Juan Bernat. Tasci was soon relegated to the substitutes bench for the rest of the season, as the club went on to win the league. At the end of the 2015–16 season, during which he made three appearances, Tasci said that he regretted joining the club, citing lack of playing time. The club decided not to take up an option to sign Tasci on a permanent basis.

=== İstanbul Başakşehir ===
On 5 January 2019, having spent six-months as a free agent, he finally moved to Turkey to join title contender İstanbul Başakşehir. Upon joining the club, Tasci said it was a dream for him to play in Turkey.

Tasci made his debut, playing the full 90 minutes in a 1–0 win over Hatayspor in the first leg round of 16 of the Turkish Cup. It wasn't until 18 February 2019 that he made his league debut for Başakşehir, playing the entire match in a 1–0 win over Antalyaspor, for which he earned the praise of the Turkish media. However, during a 2–1 win over Fenerbahçe on 9 March 2019, Tasci was substituted after a tackle from Joseph Attamah.

== International career ==
Because of his Turkish descent and German birth, he was eligible to play internationally for either Germany or Turkey, but in October 2006 he decided to play for Germany despite interest from Turkey. Tasci explained his decision by saying, "It was a decision for Germany and not against Turkey, but in the end, it's German coach Joachim Löw who made the most effort for me to come."

=== Youth career ===
On 12 September 2005, Tasci made his Germany U19 debut in a 1–1 draw against China U19. He went on to make two more appearances for the U19 side.

On 30 August 2006, Tasci played his only match for the Germany U20 team, when he started in a 1–0 win against Switzerland before being substituted.

Two months later, Tasci was called up by the Germany under-21 team for the first time, but did not play. Tasci made his debut for the Germany under-21 team on 6 February 2007 in a 2–0 win against Scotland, in what turns out to have been his only appearance for the U21 side.

=== Senior career ===
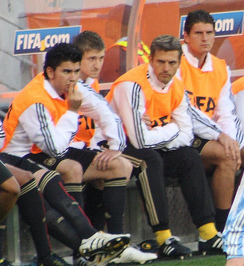
Tasci (first from left) with Germany at the 2010 World Cup

In August 2007, Tasci was called up to the Germany's senior team for the first time but did not play. He went on to make his senior international debut for Germany on 20 August 2008 in a friendly match against Belgium in Nuremberg, which they won 2–0. The debut came exactly two years after his Bundesliga debut.

He was called up to the Germany squad for the 2010 World Cup in South Africa by coach Löw, being the second player of Turkish extraction in the squad, along with Mesut Özil. Tasci made his World Cup debut as a substitute in Germany's third-place match against Uruguay, coming on in the 91st minute for Özil. He struggled to touch the ball in his 125 seconds on the pitch, prompting VfB Stuttgart sporting director Jochen Schneider to say, "But for Serdar Tasci[,] the World Cup from a purely personal point of view was certainly not satisfactory."

Tasci had hoped to return to the national side one day, but never played for Germany again.

== Personal life ==
While playing for Stuttgart, Tasci left school in February 2007, four months before he was due to leave. Although he said he intended eventually to study sports management, the decision apparently upset his mother, herself a teacher, as she wanted him to finish school. His father, an excavator, was apparently less distressed at the decision. Tasci later revealed that his mother had indeed wanted Tasci to pay more attention to school, but that his father wanted him to be a footballer, since he had given him his first football boots. In the end, he did not disappoint either his mother or father, as he studied well. Because of this, he decided to become a footballer after making a decision to continue his studies or become a footballer. Tasci also revealed that his father is now his agent.

Tasci is a devout Muslim. In addition speaking German, Tasci speaks Turkish and currently learning Russian. He has one sister.

In August 2013, the owner of a website faced legal action when he used Tasci's name on his social network page. In June 2007, Tasci visited his parents' hometown, Artvin, where he received a plaque at Yusufeli Sports Club in honour of his memory.

== Career statistics ==
=== Club ===
As of 9 January 2020.

Appearances and goals by club, season and competition
Club	Season	League			Cup^{1}		Continental^{2}		Total		Ref.
Club	Season	Division	Apps	Goals	Apps	Goals	Apps	Goals	Apps	Goals	Ref.
VfB Stuttgart II	2005–06	Regionalliga Süd	30	2	—		—		30	2	
VfB Stuttgart	2006–07	Bundesliga	26	2	5	0	—		31	2	
VfB Stuttgart	2007–08	Bundesliga	21	1	2	0	6	0	29	1	
VfB Stuttgart	2008–09	Bundesliga	27	1	3	0	10	1	40	2	
VfB Stuttgart	2009–10	Bundesliga	27	2	3	0	8	1	38	3	
VfB Stuttgart	2010–11	Bundesliga	26	0	2	0	4	1	32	1	
VfB Stuttgart	2011–12	Bundesliga	28	3	2	0	—		30	3	
VfB Stuttgart	2012–13	Bundesliga	25	0	4	0	10	1	39	1	
VfB Stuttgart	2013–14	Bundesliga	1	0	0	0	2	0	3	0	
VfB Stuttgart	Total		181	9	21	0	40	4	242	13	—
Spartak Moscow	2013–14	Premier League	4	0	0	0	—		4	0	
Spartak Moscow	2014–15	Premier League	22	1	1	1	—		23	2	
Spartak Moscow	2015–16	Premier League	16	1	1	1	—		17	2	
Spartak Moscow	2016–17	Premier League	18	0	1	0	—		19	0	
Spartak Moscow	2017–18	Premier League	14	0	1	0	7	0	22	0	
Spartak Moscow	Total		74	2	4	2	7	0	85	4	—
Bayern Munich (loan)	2015–16	Bundesliga	3	0	0	0	0	0	3	0	
İstanbul Başakşehir	2018–19	Süper Lig	4	0	1	0	—		5	0	
Career total			292	13	26	2	47	4	365	19	—

- 1.Includes DFB-Pokal and Russian Cup.
- 2.Includes UEFA Champions League and UEFA Cup/Europa League.

=== International ===
As of 19 August 2013

Appearances and goals by national team and year
National team	Year	Apps	Goals
Germany	2008	4	0
Germany	2009	5	0
Germany	2010	5	0
Total		14	0

== Honours ==
VfB Stuttgart

- Bundesliga: 2006–07

Bayern Munich

- Bundesliga: 2015–16
- DFB-Pokal: 2015–16

Spartak Moscow

- Russian Premier League: 2016–17
- Russian Super Cup: 2017
