= Timo Gebhart =

German footballer

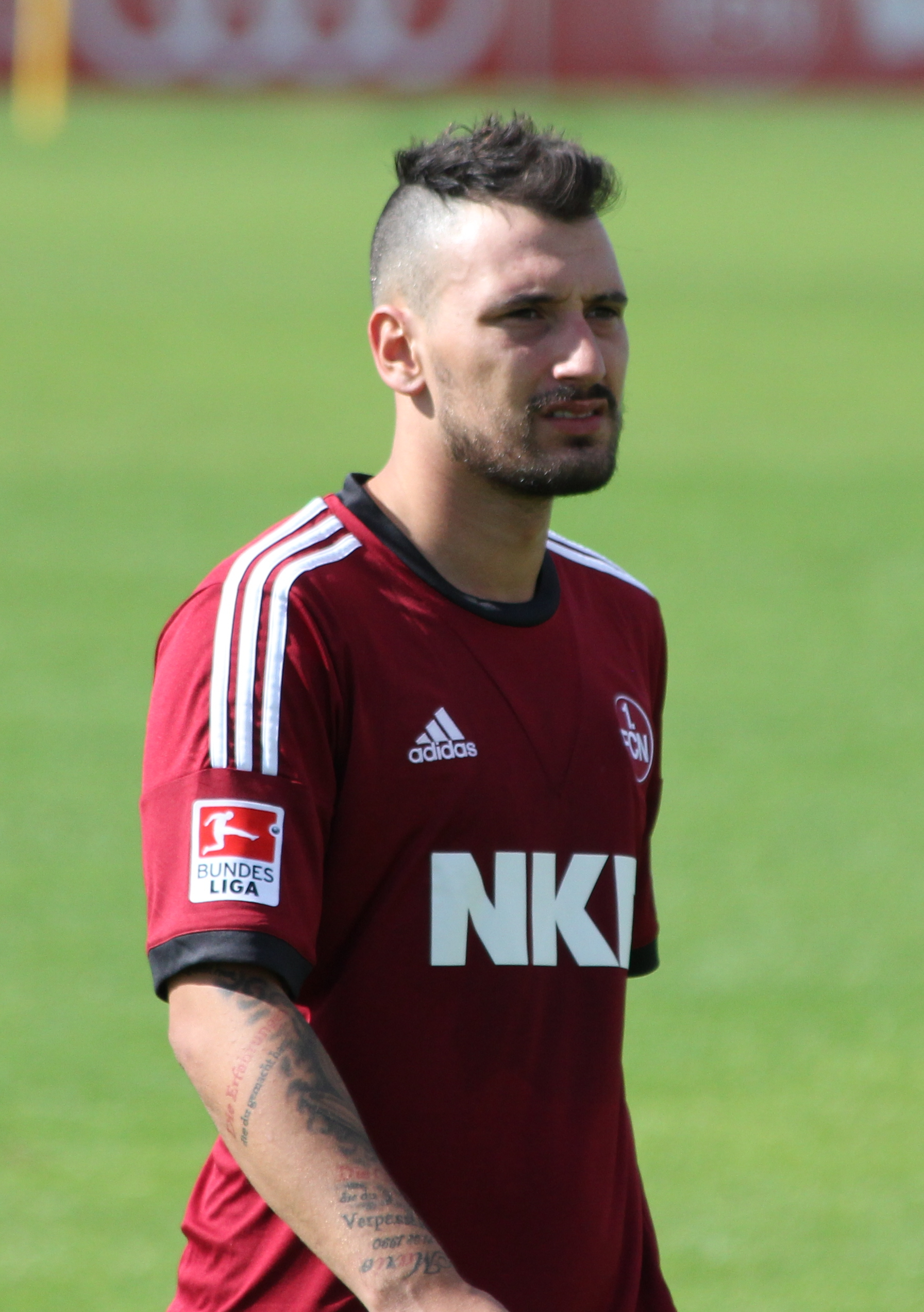
- Gebhart playing for 1. FC Nürnberg in 2013

Personal information
- Full name: Timo Martin Gebhart
- Date of birth: 12 April 1989 (age 37)
- Place of birth: Memmingen, West Germany
- Height: 1.82 m (6 ft 0 in)
- Position: Midfielder

Youth career
- FC Memmingen
- BSC Memmingen
- 2004–2007: 1860 Munich

Senior career*
Years	Team	Apps	(Gls)
2007–2008	1860 Munich II	5	(1)
2007–2009	1860 Munich	37	(5)
2009–2012	VfB Stuttgart	76	(4)
2012–2016	1. FC Nürnberg	30	(3)
2015–2016	1. FC Nürnberg II	2	(0)
2016	Steaua București	5	(0)
2016–2017	Hansa Rostock	17	(4)
2017–2018	1860 Munich	11	(5)
2019	Viktoria Berlin	11	(2)
2019–2020	1860 Munich	27	(3)
2020–2022	FC Memmingen	12	(0)
Total		233	(27)

International career
2005	Germany U16	1	(0)
2005–2006	Germany U17	9	(0)
2006–2007	Germany U18	2	(0)
2007–2008	Germany U19	14	(7)
2009	Germany U20	1	(0)
2009–2010	Germany U21	3	(1)
- * Club domestic league appearances and goals

Timo Martin Gebhart (born 12 April 1989) is a German former professional footballer who played as a midfielder.

Gebhart has spent most of his career in Germany, with one spell in Romania. He has played in the UEFA Europa League and the UEFA Champions League.

== Club career ==
In January 2009, Gebhart transferred from 2. Bundesliga side 1860 Munich to join Bundesliga side VfB Stuttgart. He signed a contract until 30 June 2013. On 14 April 2011, he suffered an ankle injury and would be out for the season.

In July 2012, Gebhart moved to 1. FC Nürnberg. He signed a four-year contract with the club.

In January 2016, Gebhart moved to Steaua București.

At the end of the 2016–17 season, Hansa Rostock and Gebhart did not agree on a contract extension.

Gebhart returned to his former club 1860 Munich for the 2017–18 season. He scored 5 goals and assisted 4 in 12 matches in all competitions but was kept out of action by injuries for large parts of the season. 1860 Munich decided not to renew his contract.

On 4 February 2019, it was confirmed that Gehbart had signed with Viktoria Berlin, after training with Wacker Burghausen in January 2019.

On 15 July 2019, Gehbart was announced at TSV 1860 Munich.

In September 2020, he signed a one-year contract with hometown club FC Memmingen of the fourth-tier Regionalliga Bayern.

In summer 2022, Gebhart announced his retirement from football. After retiring, he became a coach at FC Memmingen.

== Career statistics ==
=== Club ===
Appearances and goals by club, season and competition
Club	Season	League			Cup		Continental		Other		Total		Ref.
Club	Season	Division	Apps	Goals	Apps	Goals	Apps	Goals	Apps	Goals	Apps	Goals	Ref.
1860 Munich II	2007–08	Regionalliga Süd	4	1	—		—		—		4	1	
1860 Munich II	2008–09	Regionalliga Süd	1	0	—		—		—		1	0	
1860 Munich II	Total		5	1	—		—		—		5	1	—
1860 Munich	2007–08	2. Bundesliga	21	0	4	0	—		—		25	0	
1860 Munich	2008–09	2. Bundesliga	16	5	1	0	—		—		17	5	
1860 Munich	Total		37	5	5	0	—		—		42	5	—
VfB Stuttgart	2008–09	Bundesliga	11	0	0	0	1 (Note: Appearances in the UEFA Europa League)	1	—		12	1	
VfB Stuttgart	2009–10	Bundesliga	28	2	1	0	8 (Note: Appearances in the UEFA Champions League)	1	—		37	3	
VfB Stuttgart	2010–11	Bundesliga	25	2	2	0	7	4	—		34	6	
VfB Stuttgart	2011–12	Bundesliga	12	0	1	0	—		—		13	0	
VfB Stuttgart	Total		76	4	4	0	16	6	—		96	10	—
1. FC Nürnberg	2012–13	Bundesliga	18	2	1	0	—		—		19	2	
1. FC Nürnberg	2013–14	Bundesliga	6	0	1	0	—		—		7	0	
1. FC Nürnberg	2014–15	2. Bundesliga	6	1	1	0	—		—		7	1	
1. FC Nürnberg	Total		30	3	3	0	—		—		33	3	—
1. FC Nürnberg II	2014–15	Regionalliga Bayern	2	0	—		—		—		2	0	
Steaua București	2015–16	Liga I	5	0	0	0	—		2 (Note: Appearances in the Romanian league playoff)	0	7	0	
Hansa Rostock	2016–17	3. Liga	17	4	—		—		—		17	4	
1860 Munich	2017–18	Regionalliga Bayern	11	5	1	0	—		—		12	5	
Viktoria Berlin	2018–19	Regionalliga Nordost	11	2	0	0	—		—		11	2	
1860 Munich	2019–20	3. Liga	27	3	—		—		—		27	3	
FC Memmingen	2021–22	Regionalliga Bayern	12	0	—		—		—		12	0	
Career total			233	27	13	0	16	6	2	0	264	33	—

== Honours ==
Germany Youth

- UEFA European Under-19 Championship: 2008

Steaua București

- League Cup: 2015–16
