= Norbert Grudzinski =

German football referee

- Born: 12 May 1977 (age 49); Hamburg, West Germany

Domestic
- Years: League
- 2004–2014: 2. Bundesliga Referee
- 2008–2015: 3. Liga Referee

Norbert Grudzinski (12 May 1977) is a German football referee from Hamburg.

Grudzinski has been a German Football Association referee since 1999. In 2004, he was voted the best referee in Hamburg.

Grudzinski has overseen 85 2. Bundesliga matches as a referee, and another 168 Bundesliga matches as an assistant referee. Grudzinski replaced referee Michael Weiner in the 75th minute of a match in March 2014, marking his debut as a referee in the Bundesliga.

Grudzinski lives in Hamburg and is a wholesale and export trader.
