= Khalid Boulahrouz =

Dutch footballer (born 1981)

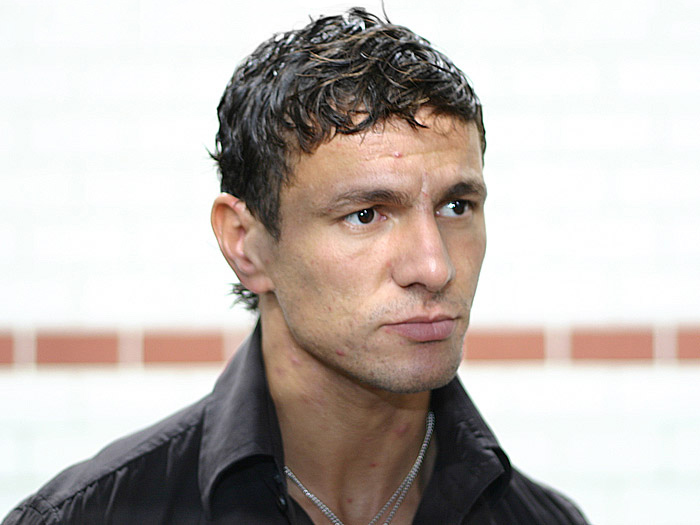

Personal information
- Full name: Khalid Boulahrouz
- Date of birth: 28 December 1981 (age 44)
- Place of birth: Maassluis, Netherlands
- Height: 1.83 m (6 ft 0 in)
- Position: Defender

Youth career
- Excelsior Maassluis
- DSOV
- Ajax
- Haarlem
- –2001: AZ

Senior career*
Years	Team	Apps	(Gls)
2001–2004	RKC	64	(4)
2004–2006	Hamburger SV	52	(1)
2006–2008	Chelsea	13	(0)
2007–2008	→ Sevilla (loan)	6	(0)
2008–2012	VfB Stuttgart	64	(2)
2012–2013	Sporting CP	11	(0)
2013–2014	Brøndby	13	(0)
2014–2015	Feyenoord	12	(0)
Total		235	(7)

International career
2002–2003	Netherlands U21	5	(0)
2004–2012	Netherlands	35	(0)
Medal record
Representing Netherlands
Men's football
FIFA World Cup
Runner-up	2010	Team
- * Club domestic league appearances and goals

Khalid Boulahrouz (Arabic: خالد بولحروز; born 28 December 1981) is a Dutch former professional footballer who played as a defender. Nicknamed "The Cannibal" for his ability to "eat up" the opposition, Boulahrouz was noted for his technical ability, tackling and versatility in defence.

He played top-flight football in the Netherlands, Germany, England, Spain, Portugal and Denmark. A full international from 2004 to 2012, he earned 35 caps and was included in the Dutch squads for two World Cups and two European Championships.

== Personal life ==
Boulahrouz was born in Maassluis, Netherlands to a family of Moroccan descent. He has eight siblings. As a youngster he went to the youth academies of Ajax and Haarlem. When he was sixteen his father died and he had to take responsibility for his family.

In December 2006, he married Sabia Thele. While Boulahrouz was in Switzerland preparing for the Euro 2008 quarter finals against Russia, his then wife Sabia gave birth to a prematurely born daughter Anissa who died in a Lausanne hospital. He opted to play against Russia a few days later, during which the Dutch team wore black armbands in his daughter's memory. The couple has a second daughter, Amaya (born March 2010) and a son, Daamin (born 30 January 2011). In January 2013 the couple announced their separation.

== Club career ==
In his youth Boulahrouz played consecutively for Excelsior Maassluis, DSOV, Ajax, Haarlem and AZ.

=== RKC Waalwijk ===
After a difficult period playing for different clubs, he finally found some stability at Waalwijk, where coach Martin Jol gave him the confidence he had been looking for. He began his professional career in the Dutch Eredivisie for RKC on 9 March 2002, against Heerenveen.

=== Hamburger SV ===
After playing two seasons for RKC he moved to Hamburg to play in the German Bundesliga at the start of the 2004–05 season. While at Hamburg, he earned his nickname "Khalid der Kannibale" ("Khalid the Cannibal") for his ability to eat up the opposition. This is illustrated by the number of cards he received – 16 yellows and three reds in two seasons at the club. He was also part of a defence that conceded the fewest goals in the 2005–06 Bundesliga season: 30 goals in 34 games.

=== Chelsea ===
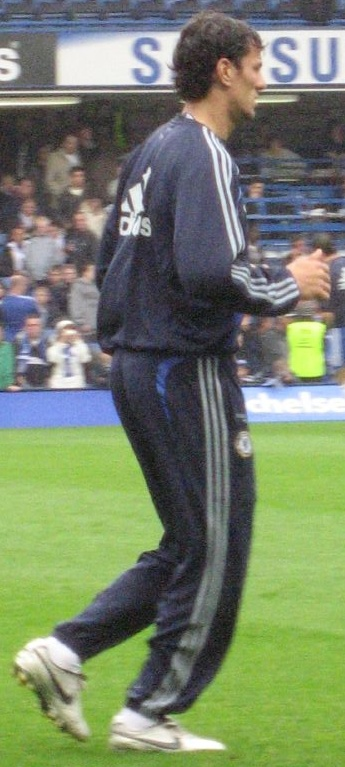
Boulahrouz with Chelsea

On 18 August 2006, Chelsea agreed a fee with Hamburg to sign Boulahrouz. The fee was thought to be around £8.5 million (€12 million). After Chelsea's opening game of the 2006–07 season, manager José Mourinho confirmed that the club had signed Boulahrouz but were waiting for his international clearance to be finalised, before speaking of the potential roles Boulahrouz would have in the side. Mourinho stated "in a short squad and in a country where you can have only 16 players for a match, it’s important to have cover for many positions." On 21 August 2006, Chelsea completed the signing of Boulahrouz. Six days later, he made his Premiership début against Blackburn Rovers. He wore the number 9 shirt, previously occupied by Hernán Crespo – this is an unconventional number for a defender, being traditionally associated with strikers, but was given to him just because it happened to be one of the numbers not currently allocated to a player by Chelsea at the time of signing.

Boulahrouz made a promising start to his Chelsea career, featuring prominently in high-profile games against Liverpool and Barcelona. However, Boulahrouz gradually dropped out of favour. Boulahrouz was out for a lengthy period of time after a knee injury, followed by a shoulder injury while playing in an FA Cup tie against Norwich City. Boulahrouz eventually dropped out of contention as the season wound down, with John Terry and Ricardo Carvalho as the first-choice defensive pairing. When Carvalho was injured, manager Mourinho paired Terry with Ghanaian midfielder Michael Essien.

==== Sevilla (loan) ====
Boulahrouz joined Spanish club Sevilla on a year-long loan for the 2007–08 season. However, he played just six games for them and was deemed surplus to requirements. He returned to Chelsea in 2008 but was not given a squad number and made no appearances.

=== VfB Stuttgart ===
On 21 July 2008, Boulahrouz moved to VfB Stuttgart for a fee of around €5 million. He struggled in his first three seasons. Early in the 2011–12 Bundesliga season, however, Khalid became a regular in the starting line-up. The 29-year-old defender had his 100th cap in the top German league on 17 September 2011 at SC Freiburg. Two weeks later, Boulahrouz scored his first goal (only his second in the Bundesliga) for Stuttgart on 30 September 2011. His goal came in the 69th minute of a 2–0 win over 1. FC Kaiserslautern.

In May 2012 VfB Stuttgart announced that his expiring contract would not be extended.

=== Sporting CP ===
On 18 July 2012, Boulahrouz signed a two-year contract with Sporting Clube de Portugal. He made 11 league appearances for the club, and on 3 September 2013 his contract was terminated.

=== Brøndby IF ===
On 7 October 2013, Boulahrouz signed a contract which is due until the summer 2014. The transfer was confirmed after many weeks of negotiating. He made 13 league appearances for Brøndby IF that season. Boulahrouz had quite a lot of injuries during his stay at Brøndby, which was one of the reasons why a new contract was not discussed.

=== Feyenoord ===
On 14 July 2014, it was officially announced that Boulahrouz had signed a one-year contract with Feyenoord on a free transfer. He was one of the replacements for outgoing defenders Stefan de Vrij, Daryl Janmaat and Bruno Martins Indi after their performances for the Netherlands at the 2014 FIFA World Cup. On 11 February 2016, more than half a year after his contract with Feyenoord had expired, Boulahrouz announced his retirement from professional football.

== International career ==
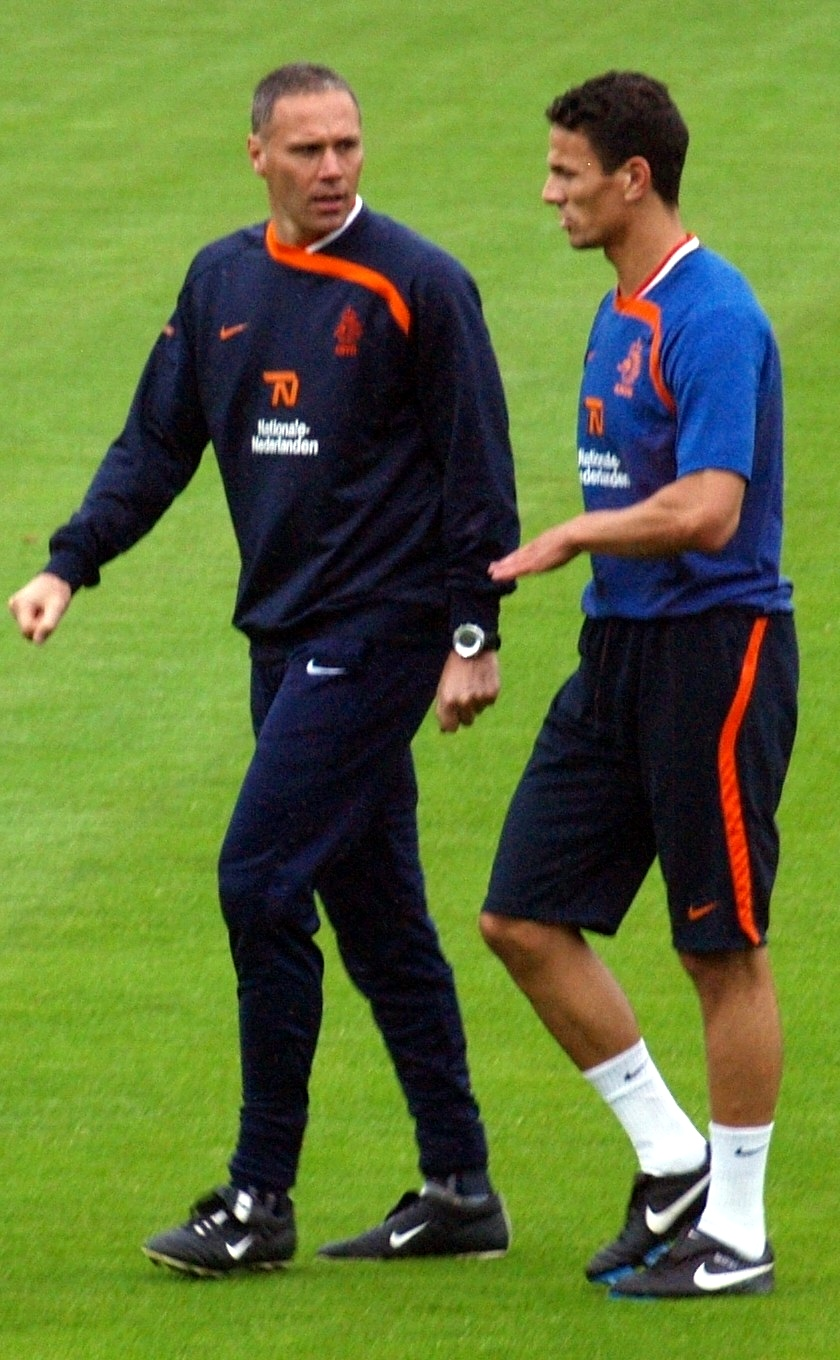
Boulahrouz with former Netherlands manager Marco van Basten.

Boulahrouz' displays for RKC caused Marco van Basten to pick him for the Netherlands national football team. He made his international début on 3 September 2004 in a 3–0 win for the Netherlands against Liechtenstein, and was named in the squad for the 2006 World Cup. He managed 34 caps for the national team, as of November 2011.

Boulahrouz was sent off from the Netherlands match against Portugal in the 2006 FIFA World Cup Round of Sixteen after a second bookable offence. He was judged to have used an elbow on Portugal's Luís Figo. Before that, he was first booked in the seventh minute after a violent tackle that injured Cristiano Ronaldo, eventually forcing the substitution of the Portuguese player. Referee Valentin Ivanov issued a total of 16 yellow cards and four red cards in this match, a World Cup record.

Having initially missed the cut for the Dutch Euro 2008 squad, following an injury to Liverpool's Ryan Babel, he was reinstated to the 23-man squad. He was chosen to start in the group games.

=== 2010 FIFA World Cup ===
Boulahrouz was included in the preliminary squad for the 2010 FIFA World Cup in South Africa. On 27 May 2010, coach Bert van Marwijk announced that Boulahrouz would be part of the final 23-man squad. Boulahrouz started in the Netherlands' last group match on 24 June, a 2–1 win over Cameroon, in place of Gregory van der Wiel. He also played in the semi-final match against Uruguay.

== Style of play ==
Goalkeeper and international teammate Edwin van der Sar said of Boulahrouz "He is an important defender, but he is also the man to lift spirits within the squad. He is the sort of guy you need around during long evenings at training camp." Former Dutch centre-back Jaap Stam said that Boulahrouz could become his successor.

== Coaching career ==
In early 2021, Boulahrouz returned to his boyhood club AZ, joining as an assistant coach for the Under-18 team; in September 2021 he successively signed a two-year contract with the club as an assistant and defensive coach for the senior team, a role he left by the end of the 2021–22 season.

== Career statistics ==
=== Club ===
Appearances and goals by club, season and competition
Club	Season	League			National cup (Note: Includes KNVB Cup, DFB-Pokal, FA Cup, Copa del Rey)		League cup (Note: Includes Football League Cup, Taça da Liga)		Continental		Total	
Club	Season	Division	Apps	Goals	Apps	Goals	Apps	Goals	Apps	Goals	Apps	Goals
RKC Waalwijk	2001–02	Eredivisie	1	0	0	0	—		—		1	0
RKC Waalwijk	2002–03	Eredivisie	31	0	4	0	—		—		35	0
RKC Waalwijk	2003–04	Eredivisie	29	4	3	1	—		—		32	5
RKC Waalwijk	2004–05	Eredivisie	3	0	1	0	—		—		4	0
RKC Waalwijk	Total		64	4	8	1	—		—		72	5
Hamburger SV	2004–05	Bundesliga	24	1	2	1	—		0	0	26	2
Hamburger SV	2005–06	Bundesliga	28	0	0	0	—		6 (Note: Appearances in UEFA Cup)	0	34	0
Hamburger SV	Total		52	1	2	1	—		6	0	60	2
Chelsea	2006–07	Premier League	13	0	2	0	3	0	5 (Note: Appearance(s) in UEFA Champions League)	0	20	0
Sevilla (loan)	2007–08	La Liga	6	0	1	0	—		1	0	8	0
VfB Stuttgart	2008–09	Bundesliga	21	0	1	0	—		5	0	26	0
VfB Stuttgart	2009–10	Bundesliga	6	0	0	0	—		2	0	8	0
VfB Stuttgart	2010–11	Bundesliga	16	0	2	0	—		6 (Note: Appearances in UEFA Europa League)	0	24	0
VfB Stuttgart	2011–12	Bundesliga	21	2	2	0	—		—		23	2
VfB Stuttgart	Total		63	2	5	0	—		13	0	81	2
Sporting CP	2012–13	Primeira Liga	11	0	0	0	2	0	3	0	16	0
Brøndby IF	2013–14	Danish Superliga	13	0	0	0	—		0	0	13	0
Feyenoord	2014–15	Eredivisie	12	0	0	0	—		6	0	18	0
Career total			235	7	18	2	5	0	34	0	292	9

=== International ===
Appearances and goals by national team and year
National team	Year	Apps	Goals
Netherlands	2004	3	0
Netherlands	2005	7	0
Netherlands	2006	9	0
Netherlands	2007	2	0
Netherlands	2008	6	0
Netherlands	2009	1	0
Netherlands	2010	3	0
Netherlands	2011	3	0
Netherlands	2012	1	0
Total		35	0

== Honours ==
Hamburger SV

- UEFA Intertoto Cup: 2005

Netherlands

- FIFA World Cup runner-up: 2010
