= Élson =

Brazilian footballer

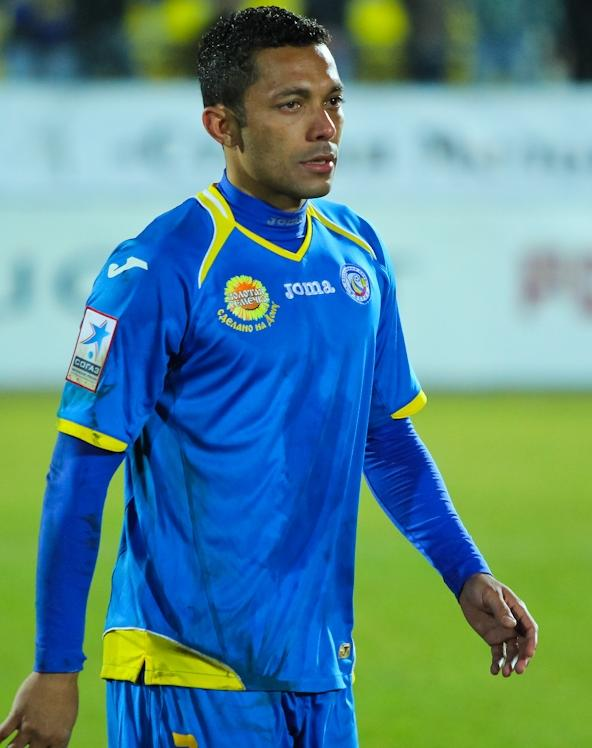
- Élson with Rostov in 2012

Personal information
- Full name: Élson Falcão da Silva
- Date of birth: 16 November 1981 (age 44)
- Place of birth: Conceição do Araguaia, Brazil
- Height: 1.72 m (5 ft 8 in)
- Position: Attacking midfielder

Youth career
- 1999–2000: Ituano

Senior career*
Years	Team	Apps	(Gls)
2000–2003	Ituano	14	(1)
2000	→ Vitória (loan)	5	(0)
2002	→ Vitória (loan)	20	(1)
2003–2005	Palmeiras	56	(4)
2005–2011	VfB Stuttgart	34	(4)
2006	→ Ponte Preta (loan)	15	(2)
2006–2007	→ Cruzeiro (loan)	20	(1)
2007	→ Goiás (loan)	24	(1)
2010	→ Hannover 96 (loan)	7	(1)
2011–2012	Rostov	15	(0)
2013	Criciúma		
2013	Oeste	5	(0)
- * Club domestic league appearances and goals

Élson Falcão da Silva (born 16 November 1981), simply known as Élson, is a Brazilian former professional footballer who played as an attacking midfielder.

== Career ==
=== Early career in Brazil ===
Élson was born in Conceição do Araguaia, Pará.

=== VfB Stuttgart and loans ===
Élson debuted in the 2008–09 season for VfB Stuttgart on 26 October 2008 against VfL Bochum at home. He came off the bench in the 56th minute for Ricardo Osorio, and ended up assisting Mario Gómez's second goal of the game, assuring their home win.

On 10 April 2009, Élson extended his contract at VfB Stuttgart until the summer of 2011.

On 1 February 2010, he left VfB Stuttgart and signed a half year loan deal with Hannover 96. He played in the second half of the 2009–10 season in seven games for Hannover 96 and scored one goal before returning to VfB Stuttgart on 30 June 2010.

On 18 July 2010, Hannover 96 and VfB Stuttgart agreed terms for a permanent move of Élson to Hannover. But on 22 July 2010, Hannover 96 did not stick to the agreement. On 30 June 2011, the contract of Élson with VfB Stuttgart expired.

=== FC Rostov ===
In August 2011 Élson moved to FC Rostov.

== Honours ==
- Campeonato Paulista: 2002
- Campeonato Brasileiro Série B: 2003
