= Matthias Schwarz =

German footballer

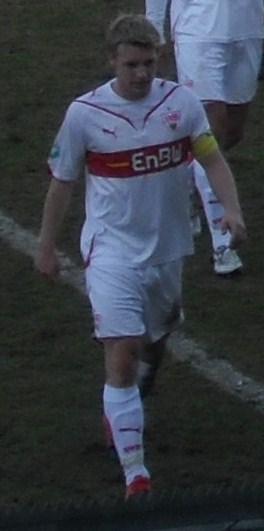

Personal information
- Full name: Matthias Schwarz
- Date of birth: 28 December 1987 (age 38)
- Place of birth: Miltenberg, West Germany
- Height: 1.81 m (5 ft 11 1/2 in)
- Position: Midfielder

Team information
- Current team: FC Alsterbrüder
- Number: 21

Youth career
- –2002: TSV Amorbach
- 2002–2006: Bayern Munich

Senior career*
Years	Team	Apps	(Gls)
2006–2008	Bayern Munich II	64	(7)
2008–2009	FC Ingolstadt 04	26	(0)
2009–2011	VfB Stuttgart II	65	(5)
2011–2016	Kickers Offenbach	126	(3)
2018–	FC Alsterbrüder	32	(8)
- * Club domestic league appearances and goals as of 30 January 2021

Matthias Schwarz (born 28 December 1987) is a German footballer who plays as a midfielder for FC Alsterbrüder.

He joined VfB Stuttgart in July 2009 from FC Ingolstadt 04. Prior to this, he played for Bayern Munich II.
