= Florian Meyer (referee) =

German football referee

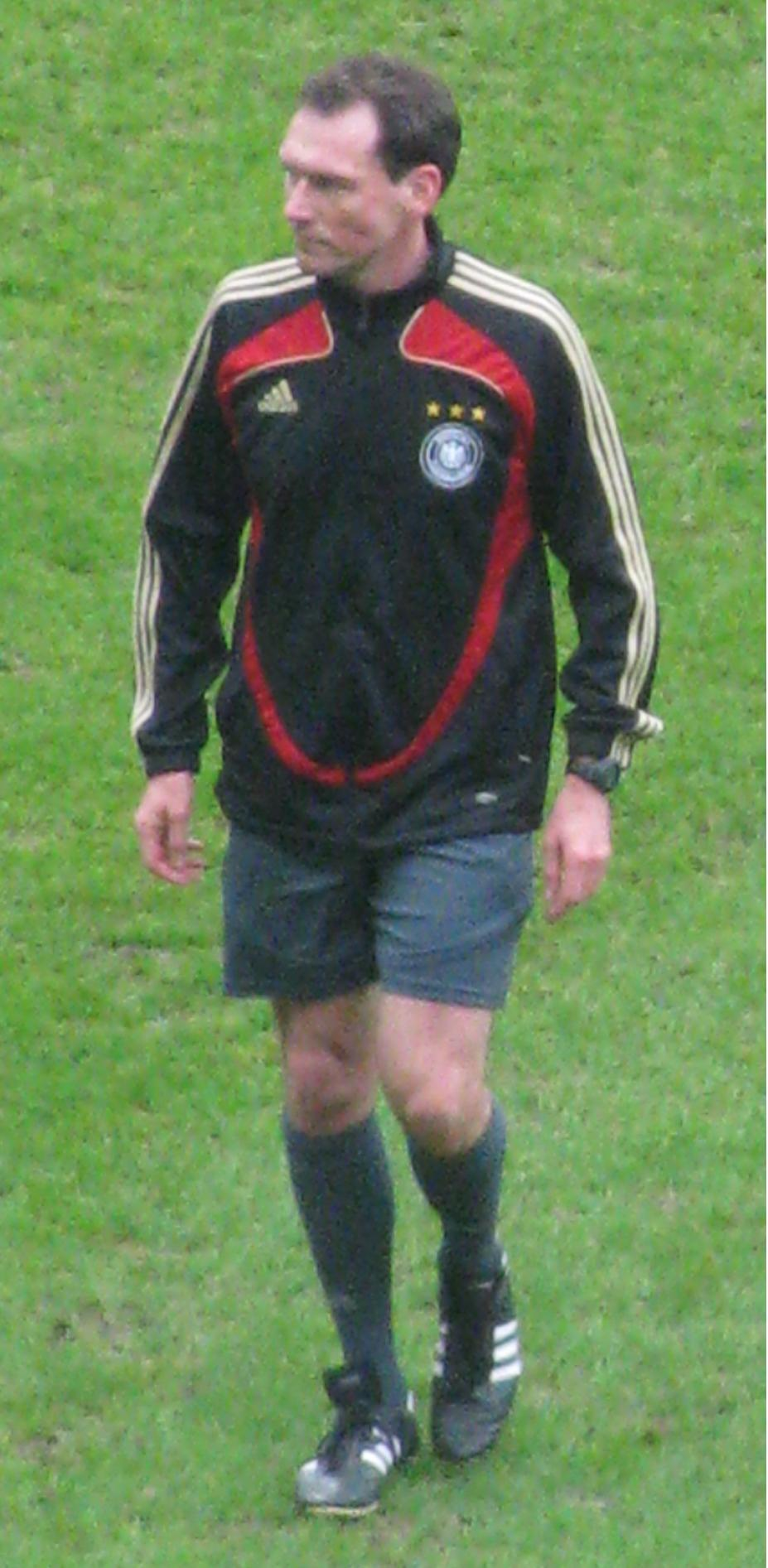
- Meyer in 2009
- Born: 21 November 1968 (age 57); Braunschweig, West Germany
- Other occupation: Firm manager

Domestic
Years	League	Role
1996–2016	DFB	Referee
1997–2016	2. Bundesliga	Referee
1999–2016	Bundesliga	Referee

International
Years	League	Role
2002–2013	FIFA listed	Referee

Florian Meyer (born 21 November 1968) is a former German football referee who is based in Burgdorf. He refereed for RSV Braunschweig of the Lower Saxony Football Association.

== Refereeing career ==
He has officiated in the German Football Association (DFB) since 1996 and he was a FIFA-referee from 2002 to 2013. He was fourth official for the 2007 UEFA Champions League Final between A.C. Milan and Liverpool.

Meyer retired from officiating in 2016 because he reached the age limit for German referees, which is 47. His final Bundesliga match officiated was between FC Augsburg and Hamburger SV.

== Personal life ==
Meyer lives in Burgdorf and is a firm manager.
