= 2016–17 FC Rot-Weiß Erfurt season =

Rot-Weiß Erfurt
2016–17 season
- Manager: Stefan Krämer
- Stadium: Steigerwaldstadion
- 3. Liga: 16th
- Thuringian Cup: Final
Home colours	Away colours
- All statistics correct as of 19 April 2017.

The 2016–17 FC Rot-Weiß Erfurt season is the 51st season in the football club's history. For the 9th consecutive season, Rot-Weiß Erfurt play in the 3. Liga. They also are participating in this season's edition of the Thuringian Cup. The season covers a period from 1 July 2016 to 30 June 2017.

== Players ==
=== Squad ===
As of 21 August 2016

Note: Flags indicate national team as defined under FIFA eligibility rules; some limited exceptions apply. Players may hold more than one non-FIFA nationality.

No.	Pos.	Nation	Player
1	GK	(Germany) GER	Philipp Klewin
2	DF	(Germany) GER	Fabian Hergesell
3	DF	(Germany) GER	Jonas Struß
4	DF	(Germany) GER	Jannis Nikolaou
6	DF	(Germany) GER	André Laurito
7	MF	(Germany) GER	Theodor Bergmann
8	MF	(Albania) ALB	Liridon Vocaj
9	FW	(Turkey) TUR	Tugay Uzan
10	MF	(Germany) GER	Daniel Brückner
11	FW	(Germany) GER	Aloy Ihenacho
13	MF	(Poland) POL	Sebastian Tyrała
14	MF	(Germany) GER	Maik Baumgarten
16	GK	(Germany) GER	Erik Domaschke

No.	Pos.	Nation	Player
17	DF	(Germany) GER	Luka Odak
18	MF	(Turkey) TUR	Okan Aydın
19	FW	(Germany) GER	Max Pommer
20	DF	(Finland) FIN	Mikko Sumusalo
21	DF	(Germany) GER	Jens Möckel
22	MF	(Germany) GER	Christoph Menz
23	DF	(Germany) GER	Pablo Pigl
25	DF	(Germany) GER	Mario Erb
27	FW	(Germany) GER	Carsten Kammlott
29	MF	(Germany) GER	Samir Benamar
33	MF	(Germany) GER	Tobias Kraulich
37	FW	(Germany) GER	Christopher Bieber

== Competitions ==
Win Draw Loss

=== 3. Liga ===
==== League table ====
Pos	Team	Pld	W	D	L	GF	GA	GD	Pts
12	Sportfreunde Lotte	38	13	9	16	46	47	−1	48
13	Hallescher FC	38	10	18	10	34	39	−5	48
14	Rot-Weiß Erfurt	38	12	11	15	34	47	−13	47
15	Hansa Rostock	38	10	16	12	44	46	−2	46
16	Fortuna Köln	38	12	10	16	37	59	−22	46

Source: DFB
Rules for classification: 1) Points; 2) Goal difference; 3) Goals scored

==== Results summary ====
Overall								Home						Away					
Pld	W	D	L	GF	GA	GD	Pts	W	D	L	GF	GA	GD	W	D	L	GF	GA	GD
37	8	14	15	37	42	−5	38	6	6	7	24	19	+5	2	8	8	13	23	−10

Last updated: 13 May 2017.
Source: kicker

==== Results by round ====
Round	1	2	3	4	5	6	7	8	9	10	11	12	13	14	15	16	17	18	19	20	21	22	23	24	25	26	27	28	29	30	31	32	33	34	35	36	37	38
Ground	H	A	H	A	H	A	H	A	H	A	H	A	H	A	A	H	A	H	A	A	H	A	H	A	H	A	H	A	H	A	H	A	H	H	A	H	A	H
Result	L	W	D	D	W	W	L	L	L	D	W	L	W	D	L	L	W	L	L	L	W	D	L	W	L	W	W	L	D	L	D	D	D	D	D	L	W	
Position	16	16	16	16	16	16	16	16	16	16	14	14	14	14	16	16	16	16	16	16	16	16	16	16	16	16	16	16	16	16	16	16	16	16	16	16	16	

Updated to match(es) played on 13 May 2017. Source:
A = Away; H = Home; W = Win; D = Draw; L = Loss

==== Matches ====
30 July 2016 Match 1	RW Erfurt	0–3	Hallescher FC	Erfurt
14:00	Nikolaou (yellow card) 30'; Erb (yellow card) 43'	Report	Pintol 3'; Lindenhahn 66'; Gjasula (yellow card) 73'; André Wallenborn (yellow card) 77' (goal) 83'	Stadium: Steigerwaldstadion; Attendance: 8,168; Referee: (Germany) Daniel Siebert (referee)

6 August 2016 Match 2	FSV Frankfurt	0–1	RW Erfurt	Frankfurt am Main
14:00	Schleusener (yellow card) 11'; Streker (yellow card) 23'	Report	Kammlott 85'	Stadium: Frankfurter Volksbank Stadion; Attendance: 4,352; Referee: (Germany) Aarne Aarnink

9 August 2016 Match 3	RW Erfurt	0–0	VfR Aalen	Erfurt
18:30	Nikolaou (yellow card) 20'; Uzan (yellow card) 66'; Bieber (yellow card) 88'	Report	Welzmüller (yellow card) 82'; Vasiliadis (yellow card) 90+1'; Müller (yellow card) 90+2'; Schulz (yellow card) 90+3'	Stadium: Steigerwaldstadion; Attendance: 5,339; Referee: (Germany) Timo Gerach

12 August 2016 Match 4	Sportfreunde Lotte	2–2	RW Erfurt	Lotte
19:00	Steinhart (yellow card) 8'; Kaffenberger (yellow card) 20'; Freiberger 33'; Wendel (yellow card) 45' (yellow-red card); Neidhart (yellow card) 65' (goal) 67'; Pires-Rodrigues (yellow card) 79'	Report	Nikolaou (yellow card) 10'; Odak (yellow card) 65'; Kammlott 75' (pen.) 79'; Bergmann (yellow card) 77'; Benamar (yellow card) 83'	Stadium: Frimo Stadion; Attendance: 1,898; Referee: (Germany) Robert Kampka

27 August 2016 Match 5	RW Erfurt	3–0	Fortuna Köln	Erfurt
14:00	Pigl 49'; Kammlott 59'; Vocaj (yellow card) 86'; Uzan 90'	Report		Stadium: Steigerwaldstadion; Attendance: 4,113; Referee: (Germany) Benjamin Cortus

11 September 2016 Match 6	FSV Zwickau	1–2	RW Erfurt	Zwickau
14:00	Göbel (yellow card) 8'; Frick (yellow card) 10'; Bär 31' (yellow card) 50'; König (yellow card) 42'; Sorge (yellow card) 84'	Report	Brückner 3' (yellow card) 90+3'; Odak (yellow card) 33'; Kammlott 36'; Menz (yellow card) 45'	Stadium: Stadion Zwickau; Attendance: 6,891; Referee: (Germany) Henry Müller

17 September 2016 Match 7	RW Erfurt	1–3	SC Paderborn	Erfurt
14:00	Kammlott (yellow card) 16'; Odak (yellow card) 72'; Vocaj 83'	Report	Bickel 23'; Michel 41' 79'; Zolinski (yellow card) 45+1'; Schonlau (yellow card) 58'; Sebastian (yellow card) 75'; Krauße (yellow card) 81'	Stadium: Steigerwaldstadion; Attendance: 5,550; Referee: (Germany) Patrick Schult

20 September 2016 Match 8	VfL Osnabrück	3–0	RW Erfurt	Osnabrück
18:30	schulz 25' (pen.) (yellow card) 66'; Syhre (yellow card) 53'; Wriedt 60'; Kristo 86'	Report	Odak (yellow card) 23'; Nikolaou (yellow card) 38'	Stadium: osnatel ARENA; Attendance: 8,330; Referee: (Germany) Eric Müller

25 September 2016 Match 9	RW Erfurt	0–1	MSV Duisburg	Erfurt
14:00	Tyrała (yellow card) 45+1'	Report	Albutat (yellow card) 36'; Brandstetter 51'; Özbek (yellow card) 83'	Stadium: Steigerwaldstadion; Attendance: 4,981; Referee: (Germany) Benedikt Kempkes

2 October 2016 Match 10	Mainz 05 II	1–1	RW Erfurt	Mainz
14:00	Häusl 20'; Halimi (red card) 71'	Report	Nikolaou 13'; Vocaj (yellow card) 71'	Stadium: Bruchwegstadion; Attendance: 998; Referee: (Germany) Matthias Jöllenbeck

15 October 2016 Match 11	RW Erfurt	1–0	1. FC Magdeburg	Erfurt
14:00	Odak (yellow card) 29'; Bieber 82'	Summary	Handke (yellow card) 44'; Farrona-Pulido (yellow card) 62'	Stadium: Steigerwaldstadion; Attendance: 8,985; Referee: (Germany) Robert Schröder

=== Thuringian Cup ===
9 October 2016 Last 16	SV Schott Jena	1–5	RW Erfurt	Jena
15:00		Report		Stadium: Sportzentrum Oberaue

12 November 2016 Quarter Final	FSV 06 Eintracht Hildburghausen	1–7	RW Erfurt	Hildburghausen
13:00		Summary		Stadium: Kunstrasen W.-Bergmann

17 April 2017 Semi Final	SC 1903 Weimar	0–3	RW Erfurt	Weimar
14:00		Summary		Stadium: Sportpark Lindenberg
