= 2008–09 FC Bayern Munich II season =

FC Bayern Munich II
2008–09 season
- Manager: Hermann Gerland (until 27 April 2009); Mehmet Scholl (from 27 April 2009)
- Stadium: Grünwalder Stadion, Munich
- 3. Liga: 5th
- Top goalscorer: Thomas Müller (15)
Home colours	Away colours	Third colours

The 2008–09 FC Bayern Munich II season is the first season they participated in the 3. Liga.

== Review ==
=== July–September ===
On 27 July, Bayern Munich II opened up their season with a 2–1 victory against Union Berlin. Thomas Müller and Mehmet Ekici scored for Bayern II and Shergo Biran scored for Union Berlin. Bayern II finished the matchday tied for fifth with VfR Aalen. On matchday two, on 2 August, Bayern II and Borussia Wuppertal finished in a 2–2 draw. Deniz Yılmaz and Mehmet Ekici scored for Bayern II and Marcel Reichwein and Tobias Damm scored for Borussia Wuppertal. Bayern II finished the matchday in seventh place. On matchday three, on 16 August, Bayern II defeated Dynamo Dresden 1–0 with a goal from Daniel Sikorski. Bayern II finished the matchday in third place. On matchday four, on 23 August, Bayern II defeated Eintracht Braunschweig 1–0 with a goal from Mehmet Ekici. Bayern II finished the matchday in first place. On matchday five, on 29 August, Bayern II defeated Carl Zeiss Jena 2–1. Deniz Yılmaz and Thomas Müller scored for Bayern II and Salvatore Amirante scored for Carl Zeiss Jena. Bayern II finished the matchday in second place. The match between Bayern II and VfR Aalen on matchday six, on 13 September, finished in a goalless draw. Bayern II finished the matchday in second place. Bayern II had their second consecutive draw after a 1–1 draw against Werder Bremen II on matchday seven, on 19 September. Bayern II finished the matchday in third place. Bayern II loss of their first match of the season after losing to SC Paderborn 07 2–1 on matchday eight, on 27 September. Frank Löning scored two goals for Paderborn and Daniel Sikorski scored for Bayern II. Bayern II finished the matchday in seventh place.

=== October–December ===
Bayern II drew all four of their matches in October. The first match, on matchday nine, on 5 October, against Stuttgarter Kickers, finished in a 3–3 draw. Bayern II got two goals from Deniz Yılmaz and a goal from Toni Kroos and Stuttgarter Kickers got a goal each from Michael Schürg, Benedikt Deigendesch, and Angelo Vaccaro. Bayern II finished the matchday in seventh place. The second match, against Fortuna Düsseldorf, on matchday 10, on 18 October, finished in a 1–1 draw. Thomas Müller scored for Bayern II and Ranisav Jovanović scored for Fortuna Düsseldorf. Bayern II finished the matchday in sixth place. In the third match against SpVgg Unterhaching, on matchday 11, on 26 October, finished in a goalless draw. Bayern II finished the matchday in seventh place. In the final match in October, on matchday 12, on 29 October, Bayern and SV Sandhausen finished in a 3–3 draw. Bayern II got two goals from Thomas Müller and a goal from Daniel Sikorski. Alf Mintzel, Sreto Ristić, and Roberto Pinto scored for Sandhausen. Bayern II player Oliver Stierle was sent–off. Bayern II finished the matchday in seventh place. Bayern II started November with a 2–2 draw against Jahn Regensburg on 2 November. Bayern II got goals from Thomas Müller and Daniel Sikorski. Jahn Regensburg got goals from Nico Beigang and Andreas Schäffer. Bayern II finished the matchday in eighth place.

== Results ==
=== Final league table ===
Pos	Team	Pld	W	D	L	GF	GA	GD	Pts	Promotion, qualification or relegation
3	SC Paderborn 07 (O, P)	38	20	8	10	68	38	+30	68	Qualification to promotion play-offs and DFB-Pokal
4	SpVgg Unterhaching	38	20	7	11	57	46	+11	67	Qualification for DFB-Pokal
5	Bayern Munich II (Note: Reserve teams are ineligible for promotion or DFB-Pokal qualification.)	38	14	17	7	54	38	+16	59	
6	Kickers Emden (Note: Kickers Emden retracted their application for a 3. Liga license for the 2009–10 season and were automatically relegated. SV Wacker Burghausen took their spot.) (R)	38	16	11	11	45	44	+1	59	Relegation to Oberliga Niedersachsen
7	Kickers Offenbach	38	12	16	10	40	35	+5	52	

Source: www.kicker.de (German)
Rules for classification: 1) points; 2) goal difference; 3) number of goals scored.
(O) Play-off winners; (P) Promoted; (R) Relegated

=== Results summary ===
Overall								Home						Away					
Pld	W	D	L	GF	GA	GD	Pts	W	D	L	GF	GA	GD	W	D	L	GF	GA	GD
38	14	17	7	54	38	+16	59	10	6	3	33	18	+15	4	11	4	21	20	+1

Last updated: 28 July 2015.

=== League results ===
MD	Date	H/A	Opponent	Res. F–A	Att.	Goalscorers		Table		Ref.
MD	Date	H/A	Opponent	Res. F–A	Att.	Bayern Munich II	Opponent	Pos.	Pts.	Ref.
1	27 July	H	Union Berlin	2–1	3,300	Müller 48'; Ekici 77'	Biran 80'	T5	3	
2	2 August	A	Borussia Wuppertal	2–2	6,281	Yılmaz 55'; Ekici 69' (pen.)	Reichwein 53' (pen.); Damm 75'	7	4	
3	16 August	H	Dynamo Dresden	1–0	7,000	Sikorski 5'	—	3	7	
4	23 August	A	Eintracht Braunschweig	1–0	16,300	Ekici 66'	—	1	10	
5	29 August	H	Carl Zeiss Jena	2–1	2,500	Yılmaz 20'; Müller 41'	Amirante 84'	2	13	
6	13 September	A	VfR Aalen	0–0	3,226	—	—	2	14	
7	19 September	H	Werder Bremen II	1–1	1,500	Ekici 85'	Oehrl 3'	3	15	
8	27 September	A	Paderborn	1–2	9,431	Sikorski 73'	Löning 17', 44'	7	15	
9	5 October	H	Stuttgarter Kickers	3–3	950	Yılmaz 45', 90'; Kroos 81'	Schürg 12'; Deigendesch 19'; Vaccaro 20'	7	16	
10	18 October	A	Fortuna Düsseldorf	1–1	13,150	Müller 15'	Jovanović 63'	6	17	
11	26 October	H	Unterhaching	0–0	2,000	—	—	7	18	
12	29 October	A	Sandhausen	3–3	2,200	Sikorski 13'; Müller 72', 83'	Mintzel 53'; Ristić 62'; Pinto 77'	7	19	
13	2 November	H	Jahn Regensburg	2–2	1,200	Müller 45'; Sikorski 88'	Beigang 64'; Schäffer 79'	8	20	
14										
15										
16										
17										
18										
19										
20										
21										
22										
23										
24										
25										
26										
27										
28										
29										
30										
31										
32										
33										
34										
35										
36										
37										
38										

== Squad and statistics ==
Players	T. App	Starts	S. App	Goals	Booked	(yellow card) (red card)	Sent off (straight red)	Ref.
Goalkeepers
Hans-Jörg Butt	4	4	0	1	0	0	0	
Max Grün	3	3	0	0	0	0	0	
Thomas Kraft	24	24	0	0	2	0	0	
Maximilian Riedmüller	8	7	1	0	1	0	0	
Defenders
Holger Badstuber	32	32	0	3	5	0	1	
Alexander Benede	12	3	9	0	3	0	0	
Diego Contento	12	11	1	2	0	0	0	
Mario Erb	2	0	2	0	0	0	0	
Maximilian Haas	15	11	4	2	3	0	0	
Timo Heinze	32	22	10	0	2	0	0	
Marco Höferth	3	0	3	0	0	0	0	
Björn Kopplin	20	15	5	0	1	0	0	
Georg Niedermeier	18	18	8	0	5	1	0	
Christian Saba	37	37	0	0	4	0	0	
Stefan Schürf	12	10	2	0	0	0	0	
Oliver Stierle	16	14	2	0	2	1	0	
Midfielders
Hamit Altintop	1	1	0	0	0	0	0	
Viktor Bopp	9	5	4	3	0	0	0	
Manuel Duhnke	19	6	13	1	4	0	0	
Mehmet Ekici	32	31	1	6	8	0	0	
Stephan Fürstner	26	20	6	1	0	0	0	
Yannick Kakoko	3	2	1	0	0	0	0	
Toni Kroos	1	1	0	1	0	0	0	
Thomas Müller	32	32	0	15	1	0	0	
Stefan Rieß	16	8	8	1	2	0	0	
Dominik Rohracker	6	0	6	0	0	0	0	
Tom Schütz	34	27	7	0	0	0	0	
Marco Stier	13	9	4	0	3	0	0	
Forwards
Vitus Nagorny	18	9	9	1	1	0	1	
Daniel Sikorski	35	35	0	10	3	0	0	
Deniz Yilmaz	32	30	2	7	3	0	0	
