= 2013–14 SpVgg Unterhaching season =

SpVgg Unterhaching
2013–14 season
- Chairman: Manfred Schwabl
- Manager: Christian Ziege
- Stadium: Sportpark Unterhaching
- 3. Liga: 17th
Home colours	Away colours

SpVgg Unterhaching are a German football club which are based in Unterhaching. During the 2013–14 season they will compete in the following competitions: 3.Liga, Regional Cup Bayern.

== Squad ==
Note: Flags indicate national team as defined under FIFA eligibility rules; some limited exceptions apply. Players may hold more than one non-FIFA nationality.

No.	Pos.	Nation	Player
1	GK	GER	Korbinian Müller
2	DF	GER	Maximilian Bauer
3	DF	GER	Fabian Götze
4	DF	GER	Thomas Hagn
5	DF	GER	Daniel Hofstetter
6	MF	GER	Roland Sternisko
7	MF	GER	Marius Willsch
8	FW	GER	Marius Duhnke
9	FW	GER	Andreas Voglsammer
10	MF	GER	Florian Heller
11	FW	GER	Janik Haberer
13	DF	GER	Benjamin Schwarz
15	MF	GER	Stefan Haas
16	DF	GER	Alexander Hack
17	DF	GER	Jonas Hummels (Captain)
19	MF	GER	Maximilian Welzmüller
20	MF	GER	Florian Bichler

No.	Pos.	Nation	Player
21	MF	GER	Quirin Moll
22	MF	GER	Tobias Killer
24	DF	GER	Mario Erb
27	MF	GER	Leon Müller-Wiesen
28	FW	GER	Pascal Köpke
29	FW	GER	Michael Marinkovic
30	MF	GEO	Lucas Hufnagel
31	GK	GER	Michael Zetterer
32	MF	GER	Thomas Steinherr
33	GK	GER	Sebastian Wolf
34	GK	GER	Felix Dinkel
35	DF	GER	Kevin Hingerl
37	MF	ESP	Kenny Prince Redondo
39	DF	GER	Danilo Dittrich
40	MF	GER	Brian Gallo
45	MF	GER	Sandro Kaiser

== Competitions ==
=== 3.Liga ===
==== League table ====
Pos	Team	Pld	W	D	L	GF	GA	GD	Pts	Promotion, qualification or relegation
15	VfB Stuttgart II (Note: Reserve teams are ineligible for promotion or DFB-Pokal qualification.)	38	12	10	16	45	54	−9	46	
16	Holstein Kiel	38	10	15	13	42	38	+4	45	
17	SpVgg Unterhaching	38	11	10	17	50	65	−15	43	
18	SV Elversberg (R)	38	10	10	18	32	54	−22	40	Relegation to Regionalliga
19	Wacker Burghausen (R)	38	9	10	19	39	58	−19	37	Relegation to Regionalliga

Source: kicker.de
Rules for classification: 1) points; 2) goal difference; 3) number of goals scored.
(R) Relegated

==== Results summary ====
Overall								Home						Away					
Pld	W	D	L	GF	GA	GD	Pts	W	D	L	GF	GA	GD	W	D	L	GF	GA	GD
34	9	10	15	41	59	−18	37	5	6	6	23	27	−4	4	4	9	18	32	−14

Last updated: 17 June 2015.
Source: Competitive matches

==== Matches ====
Win Draw Loss

20 July 2013 1	SSV Jahn Regensburg	0–0	SpVgg Unterhaching	Regensburg
14:00 CEST (UTC+02:00)	Hein (yellow card) 35'; Windmüller (yellow card) 51'; Aosman (yellow card) 52'; Haag (yellow card) 81'	Report	Voglsammer (yellow card) 75'; Erb (yellow card) 81'	Stadium: Jahnstadion; Attendance: 4,405; Referee: Martin Petersen

27 July 2013 2	SpVgg Unterhaching	1–1	Chemnitzer FC	Unterhaching
14:00 CEST (UTC+02:00)	Welzmüller 89'	Report	Cinar 8'; Semmer (yellow card) 26'; Bankert (yellow card) 30'; Makarenko (yellow card) 46'; Stenzel (yellow card) 57'	Stadium: Sportpark Unterhaching; Attendance: 1,850; Referee: Soren Storks

9 August 2013 3	Borussia Dortmund II	4–2	SpVgg Unterhaching	Dortmund
19:00 CEST (UTC+02:00)	Derstroff 2', 29'; Hornschuh 36'; Kefkir 83'	Report	Bichler 45'; Welzmüller 89'; Hingerl (yellow card) 90+3'	Stadium: Stadion Rote Erde; Attendance: 2,840; Referee: Jonas Weickenmeier

17 August 2013 4	SpVgg Unterhaching	2–4	SV Darmstadt 98	Unterhaching
14:00 CEST (UTC+02:00)	Duhnke 56'; Voglsammer 60'; Moll (yellow card) 67'; Götze (yellow card) 88'; Müller (yellow card) 90'	Report	Gondorf (yellow card) 31'; Ivana 40' (yellow card) 43'; Stroh-Engel 45', 82', 90+5' (pen.); Sulu (yellow card) 88'	Stadium: Sportpark Unterhaching; Attendance: 3,400; Referee: Timo Gerach

24 August 2013 5	F.C. Hansa Rostock	0–1	SpVgg Unterhaching	Rostock
14:00 CEST (UTC+02:00)	Peković (yellow card) 43'; Savran (yellow card) 76'; Radjabali-Fardi (yellow card) 85'	Report	Bichler 7'; Killer (yellow card) 19'; Götze (yellow card) 88'; Müller (yellow card) 90'	Stadium: DKB-Arena; Attendance: 10,400; Referee: Tobias Reichel

6	v

7	v

8	v

9	v

10	v

11	v

12	v

13	v

14	v

15	v

16	v

17	v

18	v

19	v

20	v

21	v

22	v

23	v

24	v

25	v

26	v

27	v

28	v

29	v

30	v

31	v

32	v

33	v

34	v

35	v

36	v

37	v

38	v
