= Mario Erb =

German footballer

Personal information
- Date of birth: 16 June 1990 (age 36)
- Place of birth: Munich, West Germany
- Height: 1.86 m (6 ft 1 in)
- Position: Centre-back

Team information
- Current team: 1899 Hoffenheim II
- Number: 29

Youth career
- –1996: ESV München-Ost
- 1996–2008: Bayern Munich

Senior career*
Years	Team	Apps	(Gls)
2008–2011	Bayern Munich II	48	(2)
2011–2013	Alemannia Aachen	27	(0)
2013–2015	SpVgg Unterhaching	60	(7)
2015–2017	Rot-Weiß Erfurt	71	(5)
2017–2019	KFC Uerdingen 05	53	(2)
2019–2020	Türkgücü München	21	(2)
2020–	1899 Hoffenheim II	11	(0)

International career
2007	Germany U17	9	(0)
2007–2008	Germany U18	3	(0)
2008–2009	Germany U19	4	(0)
2009	Germany U20	3	(0)
Medal record
Germany U17
Third place	FIFA Under-17 World Cup	2007
- * Club domestic league appearances and goals as of 13:33, 27 January 2021 (UTC)

Mario Erb (born 16 June 1990) is a German footballer who plays as a centre-back for TSG 1899 Hoffenheim II.

== Club career ==
Erb joined Bayern Munich in 1996, and progressed through the junior team, where he was part of the under-17 team that were national champions in 2007. In October 2008, he made his debut for the Bayern reserve team, replacing Daniel Sikorski in a 1–1 draw at Fortuna Düsseldorf. He made one more appearance in the 3. Liga that season, and 15 the following year, and established himself as a regular player during the 2010–11 season. With the departure of Maximilian Haas in January 2011, Erb was named as reserve team captain for the remainder of the season. He was unable to prevent the team being relegated, however, and he signed for Alemannia Aachen of the 2. Bundesliga in summer 2011. Erb was injured six games into his first season at Aachen, and had to sit out the remainder of the season, which ended in his second consecutive relegation. Aachen were relegated in the 2012–13 season as well, so Erb left the club in summer 2013, returning to Munich to sign for SpVgg Unterhaching.

In the summer 2015, Erb joined Rot-Weiß Erfurt

== International career ==
Erb has represented the Germany youth team at under-17 to under-20 level, and played in all seven matches as the team finished third at the 2007 FIFA U-17 World Cup.

== Career statistics ==
As of matches played on 30 August 2020.

Appearances and goals by club, season and competition
Club	Season	League			Cup		Total		Ref.
Club	Season	Division	Apps	Goals	Apps	Goals	Apps	Goals	Ref.
Bayern Munich II	2008–09	3. Liga	2	0	—		2	0	
Bayern Munich II	2009–10	3. Liga	15	0	—		15	0	
Bayern Munich II	2010–11	3. Liga	31	2	—		31	2	
Bayern Munich II	Total		48	2	—		48	2	—
Alemannia Aachen	2011–12	2. Bundesliga	6	0	1	0	7	0	
Alemannia Aachen	2012–13	3. Liga	21	0	1	0	22	0	
Alemannia Aachen	Total		27	0	2	0	29	0	—
SpVgg Unterhaching	2013–14	3. Liga	29	2	—		29	2	
SpVgg Unterhaching	2014–15	3. Liga	31	5	—		31	5	
SpVgg Unterhaching	Total		60	7	—		60	7	—
Rot-Weiß Erfurt	2015–16	3. Liga	37	3	—		37	3	
Rot-Weiß Erfurt	2016–17	3. Liga	34	2	—		34	2	
Rot-Weiß Erfurt	Total		71	5	—		71	5	—
KFC Uerdingen	2017–18	Regionalliga West	31	2	—		31	2	
KFC Uerdingen	2018–19	3. Liga	21	1	—		21	1	
KFC Uerdingen	Total		52	3	—		52	3	—
Türkgücü München	2019–20	Regionalliga Bayern	21	2	—		21	2	
1899 Hoffenheim II	2020–21	Regionalliga Südwest	11	1	—		11	1	
Career total			290	20	2	0	292	20	—
