= Duhnke =

Duhnke is a surname. Notable people with the surname include:

- Manuel Duhnke (born 1987), German footballer
- Marius Duhnke (born 1993), German footballer
