= List of FC Bayern Munich II seasons =

A season-by-season record of FC Bayern Munich II.

== Key ==
Key to league record:

- Pld = Matches played
- W = Matches won
- D = Matches drawn
- L = Matches lost
- GF = Goals for
- GA = Goals against
- Pts = Points
- Pos = Final position
- PO = Play-offs
- Avg. Att. = Average home attendance

Key to rounds:

- R1 = Round 1
- R2 = Round 2
- R3 = Round 3
- QF = Quarter-finals
- SF = Semi-finals
- RU = Runners-up
- W = Winners

Champions	Runners-up	Promoted	Relegated

== Seasons ==
Season	League												DFB-Pokal	Other	Top goalscorer(s)		Notes
Season	Division	Tier	Pld	W	D	L	GF	GA	Pts	Pos	PO	Avg. Att.	DFB-Pokal	Other	Player(s)	Goals	Notes
1956–57	Amateurliga Südbayern	3	26				54	58	26	7th							
1957–58	Amateurliga Südbayern	3	30				102	34	43	2nd							
1958–59	Amateurliga Südbayern	3	32				64	51	32	7th							
1959–60	Amateurliga Südbayern	3	30				41	48	29	11th							
1960–61	Amateurliga Südbayern	3	30				69	32	40	2nd							
1961–62	Amateurliga Südbayern	3	32				64	58	30	12th							
1962–63	Amateurliga Südbayern	3	32				42	49	24	14th							
1963–64	Landesliga Bayern-Süd	4	30				60	58	30	9th							
1964–65	Landesliga Bayern-Süd	4	28				50	40	28	6th							
1965–66	Landesliga Bayern-Süd	4	28				63	43	37	3rd							
1966–67	Landesliga Bayern-Süd	4	28				77	27	43	1st							
1967–68	Bayernliga	3	34							4th							
1968–69	Bayernliga	3	34							11th							
1969–70	Bayernliga	3	34							12th							
1970–71	Bayernliga	3	34							17th							
1971–72	Landesliga Bayern-Süd	4	34				69	39	39	5th							
1972–73	Landesliga Bayern-Süd	4	34				69	33	48	1st							
1973–74	Bayernliga	3	34							13th							
1974–75	Bayernliga	3	34							5th			Round 1				
1975–76	Bayernliga	3	34							11th							
1976–77	Bayernliga	3	34							4th			Round of 16				
1977–78	Bayernliga	3	34							4th							
1978–79	Bayernliga	3	34				65	58	37	4th					Ehrensberger	23	
1979–80	Bayernliga	3	34				47	55	34	9th							
1980–81	Bayernliga	3	34				43	56	34	9th							
1981–82	Bayernliga	3	38				58	65	36	14th							
1982–83	Bayernliga	3	36				75	39	48	2nd			Round 2	Amateur Championship - RU			
1983–84	Bayernliga	3	38				71	40	50	2nd				Amateur Championship - QF			
1984–85	Bayernliga	3	34				63	44	42	4th			Round 1				
1985–86	Bayernliga	3	34				66	57	38	9th							
1986–87	Bayernliga	3	36				75	31	50	2nd				Amateur Championship - RU			
1987–88	Bayernliga	3	32				46	50	33	7th							
1988–89	Bayernliga	3	32				72	71	33	7th							
1989–90	Bayernliga	3	30				46	50	26	12th							
1990–91	Bayernliga	3	32				58	39	39	4th							
1991–92	Bayernliga	3	32				49	41	31	5th							
1992–93	Bayernliga	3	32				58	31	40	5th							
1993–94	Bayernliga	3	32				53	24	38	4th			Round of 16				
1994–95	Regionalliga Süd	3	34	12	12	10	43	45	36	7th			Quarter-final		(Germany) Roman Grill	7	
1995–96	Regionalliga Süd	3	34	9	11	14	34	47	38	13th			Round 1		(Germany) Matthias Zimmermann	7	
1996–97	Regionalliga Süd	3	34	12	10	12	49	52	46	8th					(Germany) Carsten Lakies	22	
1997–98	Regionalliga Süd	3	34	15	3	14	45	44	48	6th					(Germany) Alexander Bugera	9	
1998–99	Regionalliga Süd	3	34	13	10	11	53	41	49	8th					(Germany) Alexander Bugera	10	
1999–2000	Regionalliga Süd	3	34	15	6	13	64	58	51	5th					(Germany) Patrick Würll	14	
2000–01	Regionalliga Süd	3	34	12	8	14	52	55	44	9th		657			(Germany) Antonio Di Salvo	16	
2001–02	Regionalliga Süd	3	34	13	9	12	58	51	48	10th		553		Bavarian Cup - W	(Germany) Steffen Hofmann (Bosnia and Herzegovina) Zvjezdan Misimović	14	
2002–03	Regionalliga Süd	3	36	16	9	11	51	35	57	4th		642	Round 1		(Austria) Ralph Hasenhüttl	12	
2003–04	Regionalliga Süd	3	34	17	13	4	71	33	64	1st		1,168			(Peru) Paolo Guerrero (Bosnia and Herzegovina) Zvjezdan Misimović	21	
2004–05	Regionalliga Süd	3	34	14	10	10	51	38	52	6th		472	Quarter-final		(Slovenia) Borut Semler	9	
2005–06	Regionalliga Süd	3	34	11	9	14	34	44	42	12th		476			(Austria) Stefan Maierhofer	11	
2006–07	Regionalliga Süd	3	34	11	13	10	41	37	46	8th		620			(Austria) Stefan Maierhofer	10	
2007–08	Regionalliga Süd	3	34	12	11	11	53	42	47	8th		898			(Austria) Daniel Sikorski	12	
2008–09	3. Liga	3	38	14	17	7	54	38	59	5th		1,536			(Germany) Thomas Müller	15	
2009–10	3. Liga	3	38	15	9	14	55	65	54	8th		1,272			(Azerbaijan) Deniz Yılmaz	13	
2010–11	3. Liga	3	38	7	9	22	30	54	30	19th		1,000			(Netherlands) Boy Deul (Germany) Steffen Wohlfarth (Azerbaijan) Deniz Yılmaz	6	
2011–12	Regionalliga Süd	4	34	8	10	16	43	54	34	14th		725			(France) Saër Sène (Netherlands) Timothy van der Meulen	8	
2012–13	Regionalliga Bayern	4	38	21	10	7	68	35	77	2nd		662			(Germany) Marius Duhnke	15	
2013–14	Regionalliga Bayern	4	34	25	4	7	94	33	79	1st	RU	1,272			(Austria) Kevin Friesenbichler (United States) Julian Green	15	
2014–15	Regionalliga Bayern	4	34	22	6	6	60	28	72	2nd		1,451			(Germany) Gerrit Wegkamp	15	
2015–16	Regionalliga Bayern	4	34	14	10	10	54	38	52	6th		1,368			(Germany) Karl-Heinz Lappe	14	
2016–17	Regionalliga Bayern	4	34	15	13	6	62	40	58	2nd		851			(Serbia) Miloš Pantović	15	
2017–18	Regionalliga Bayern	4	36	22	8	6	84	41	74	2nd		1,139		Premier League Intern. Cup - GS	(Ghana) Kwasi Okyere Wriedt	21	
2018–19	Regionalliga Bayern	4	34	22	7	5	72	30	73	1st	W	748		Premier League Intern. Cup - W	(Ghana) Kwasi Okyere Wriedt	24	
2019–20	3. Liga	3	38	19	8	11	76	60	65	1st		1,878			(Ghana) Kwasi Okyere Wriedt	24	
2020–21	3. Liga	3	38	8	13	17	47	58	37	18th		250			(Germany) Timo Kern	8	
2021–22	Regionalliga Bayern	4	38	26	8	4	113	50	86	2nd		800			(Germany) Gabriel Vidović	21	
2022–23	Regionalliga Bayern	4	38	21	8	9	94	54	71	3rd					(Armenia) Grant-Leon Ranos	20	

== See also ==
- List of FC Bayern Munich seasons
