= Deniz Yılmaz =

Association football player (born 1988)

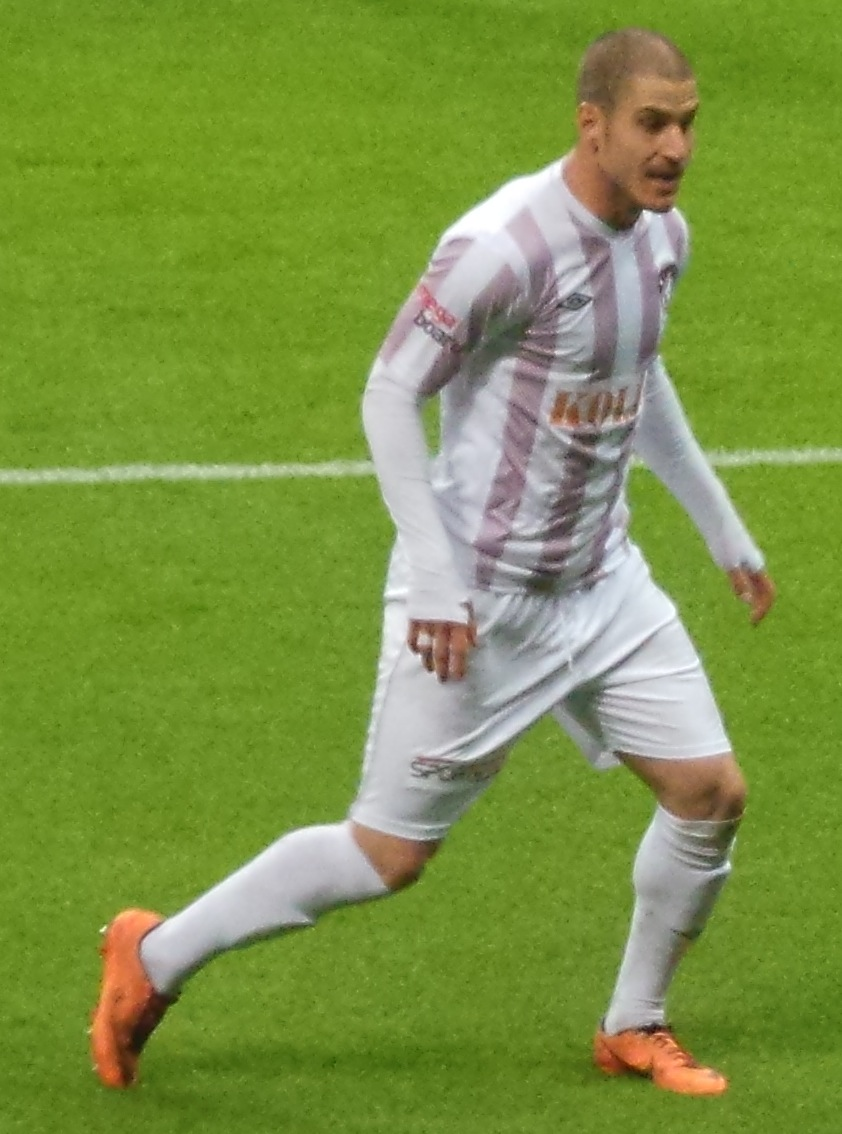
- Yılmaz in 2013 with Elazığspor

Personal information
- Date of birth: 26 February 1988 (age 38)
- Place of birth: Illerkirchberg, West Germany
- Height: 1.82 m (6 ft 0 in)
- Position: Striker

Youth career
- TV Wiblingen
- 2003–2005: SSV Ulm
- 2005: Bayern Munich

Senior career*
Years	Team	Apps	(Gls)
2005–2011	Bayern Munich II	115	(33)
2011–2013	Mainz 05 II	16	(10)
2011–2013	Mainz 05	2	(0)
2012–2013	→ SC Paderborn (loan)	25	(5)
2013–2014	Elazığspor	28	(12)
2014–2016	Trabzonspor	17	(2)
2016–2017	Bursaspor	36	(10)
2018–2019	Gençlerbirliği	31	(3)

International career^{‡}
2003–2004	Turkey U16	12	(4)
2003–2005	Turkey U17	28	(9)
2006	Turkey U18	3	(1)
2007	Turkey U19	2	(0)
2007–2010	Turkey U21	8	(2)
2016–2017	Azerbaijan	2	(0)
- * Club domestic league appearances and goals as of 24 May 2019 ‡ National team caps and goals as of 26 August 2017

Deniz Yılmaz (born 26 February 1988) is a professional footballer who last played as a striker for Turkish club Gençlerbirliği. Born in West Germany, Yılmaz is of ethnic Turkish origin. Having represented Turkey internationally at various youth levels he initially sought to play for the Turkey senior national team. After not being nominated for the 2016 European Championship squad, he chose to play for Azerbaijan.

== Club career ==
Yılmaz began his career with Bayern Munich, and made his debut for the reserve team in August 2005, as a substitute for Daniel Sikorski in a 0–0 draw with VfR Aalen. From the 2007–08 season, Yılmaz established himself as a regular in Bayern's reserve team, and was named in the first-team squad for the 2008–09 Champions League. He was named on the subs bench for the first time in a Bundesliga game against VfL Wolfsburg in October 2008. This proved to be his last involvement with Bayern's team, however, despite finishing as the top scorer for the second string in 2009–10, with thirteen goals. He was joint top scorer the following year, along with Boy Deul and Steffen Wohlfarth, but each player only managed six goals and Bayern II were relegated from the 3. Liga in last place.

In July 2011, Yılmaz joined 1. FSV Mainz 05, and made his Bundesliga debut six months later, in a 3–2 defeat to Bayer Leverkusen. He made one more appearance for Mainz in the 2011–12 season, and joined 2. Bundesliga side SC Paderborn 07 on loan for the 2012–13 season.

On 15 January 2018, Yılmaz left Bursaspor and joined Gençlerbirliği. He signed a one-and-a-half-year contract with Gençlerbirliği.

== International career ==
Yılmaz was born in West Germany to parents of Turkish descent. Yılmaz won around 50 caps for Turkey at youth level all categories comprised, including 8 for the Turkey U21. In 2016, after years of waiting for a senior Turkish call-up, Yılmaz switched to the Azerbaijan national football team. Yılmaz made his debut for Azerbaijan in a 4-0 2018 World Cup qualification loss to Northern Ireland on 11 November 2016.

== Career statistics ==
As of 26 October 2015

Appearances and goals by club, season and competition
Club	Season	League			Cup		Continental		Total		Ref.
Club	Season	Division	Apps	Goals	Apps	Goals	Apps	Goals	Apps	Goals	Ref.
Bayern Munich II	2005–06	Regionalliga Süd	5	0	—		—		5	0	
Bayern Munich II	2007–08	Regionalliga Süd	22	7	—		—		22	7	
Bayern Munich II	2008–09	3. Liga	32	7	—		—		32	7	
Bayern Munich II	2009–10	3. Liga	29	13	—		—		19	13	
Bayern Munich II	2010–11	3. Liga	27	6	—		—		27	6	
Bayern Munich II	Total		115	33	—		—		115	33	—
Mainz 05	2011–12	Bundesliga	2	0	0	0	0	0	2	0	
Mainz 05 II	2011–12	Regionalliga West	16	10	—		—		16	10	
SC Paderborn	2012–13	2. Bundesliga	25	5	1	0	—		26	5	
Elazığspor	2013–14	Süper Lig	28	12	7	1	—		35	13	
Trabzonspor	2014–15	Süper Lig	13	2	0	0	2	0	15	2	
Trabzonspor	2015–16	Süper Lig	4	0	3	0	1	0	8	1	
Trabzonspor	Total		17	2	3	1	3	0	23	3	—
Career total			201	62	8	1	3	0	212	63	—

== Honours ==
Turkey

- UEFA Under-17 Championship: 2005
