= Tugay (disambiguation) =

Tugay or Tugai may refer to:

== People ==
- Tugay (name), list of people with the name

== Other ==
- Tugay, forest ecosystem
- Tuğay, Azerbaijan village

== See also ==
- Turgay
- Tugai (disambiguation)
