= Turgay =

Turgay is a Turkish given name for males. People named Turgay include:

- Turgay Avcı, Turkish Cypriot politician
- Turgay Bahadır, Turkish-Austrian footballer
- Turgay Gemicibasi, Turkish footballer
- Turgay Semercioğlu, Turkish footballer
- Turgay Şeren, Turkish football manager

Turgay may also refer to:

- Turgay (river), a river in northern Kazakhstan
- Turgay Depression, a structural basin in Kazakhstan
- Turgay Plateau, in northern Kazakhstan
- Turgay Oblast (Russian Empire), a former administrative division

== See also ==
- Tugay (disambiguation)
- Turgai (disambiguation)
