= Witold Sikorski =

Polish footballer

Personal information
- Date of birth: 10 February 1958 (age 68)
- Place of birth: Piaseczno, Poland
- Height: 1.85 m (6 ft 1 in)
- Position: Forward

Youth career
- Energetyk Piaseczno

Senior career*
Years	Team	Apps	(Gls)
1979–1987	Legia Warsaw	191	(24)
1988	IFK Östersund		
1989	Bug Wyszków		
1989–1991	IFK Östersund		
1991–1992	Bug Wyszków		
1992–1996	SV Waidhofen an der Thaya		
1996–1997	SV Groß-Siegharts		
1997–1998	SV Weitersfeld		
1998–2002	ATSV Brand		
2003	SCU Thaya		

International career
1981	Poland	2	(0)
- * Club domestic league appearances and goals

Witold Sikorski (born 10 February 1958) is a Polish former professional footballer who played as a forward. He earned two caps for the Poland national team in 1981. His son Daniel Sikorski was also a professional footballer.

== Honours ==
Legia Warsaw

- Polish Cup: 1979–80, 1980–81
