= FC Gütersloh =

German association football club

Coordinates: 51°53′30″N 8°23′18″E

- Full name: Fußball-Club Gütersloh e.V.
- Founded: 2000; 26 years ago
- Ground: Heidewaldstadion
- Capacity: 8,400
- Chairman: Heiner Kollmeyer; Hans-Hermann Kirschner; Helmut Delker
- Manager: Julian Hesse
- League: Regionalliga West (IV)
- 2025–26: Regionalliga West, 4th of 18
Home colours	Away colours

FC Gütersloh is a German association football club based in Gütersloh, North Rhine-Westphalia.

== History ==
The club was formed in 1978 out of the merger of the football sides of Sport Vereinigung Arminia Gütersloh and Deutsche Jugendkraft Gütersloh in the hopes that the new club would be more successful than its un-storied predecessors. The union was a bit of a surprise because of some ill-will that had existed between the clubs going back to Arminia's refusal to share their stadium facility with DJK, and so make it possible for them to play in the Regionalliga in the late 1960s.

Both sides had bounced back and forth between the second and third division through the late 1960s and into the 1970s. After their merger they settled down as a mid-table Amateur Oberliga Westfalen (III) club, with a couple of poor seasons leading to relegation to Verbandsliga Westfalen (IV), but always followed by immediate promotion. The club managed to play their way into the 2. Bundesliga in 1996, on the strength of a Regionalliga West/Südwest title, for a three-year stay, but in 1999 were crushed by their 7 million DM debt. The club was dissolved by a court and all its results for the season annulled.

The club was re-organised in 2000 and took up play in the Oberliga Westfalen (IV). In January 2010, it was announced that plans were in the works for a merger with SC Wiedenbrück 2000, but the proposal failed. On 27 October 2013, the Gütersloh side suffered a record defeat losing 5:8 to SpVgg Erkenschwick: the 13 goals scored matched the total of a 1985–86 match that saw DJK Hellweg Lütgendortmund down Sportfreunde Siegen 7:6. In 2014, the club was overshadowed by rumours of around its precarious financial situation and the prospect voluntary withdrawal from play. New merger talks took place with SC Wiedenbruck and SC Verl, but these ended when the club avoided bankruptcy in October 2014 under new management.

Since 2012, the club has played in the tier five Oberliga Westfalen.

After repeated financial troubles, the club filed for insolvency in January 2017, and despite all efforts to secure funding through donations and sponsorship, announced the dissolution and liquidation of assets by the end of May 2017.

Surprisingly, new sponsors were presented on 26 May, which pledged to finance operations for the next three years. The insolvency filing is to be cancelled.

== Honours ==
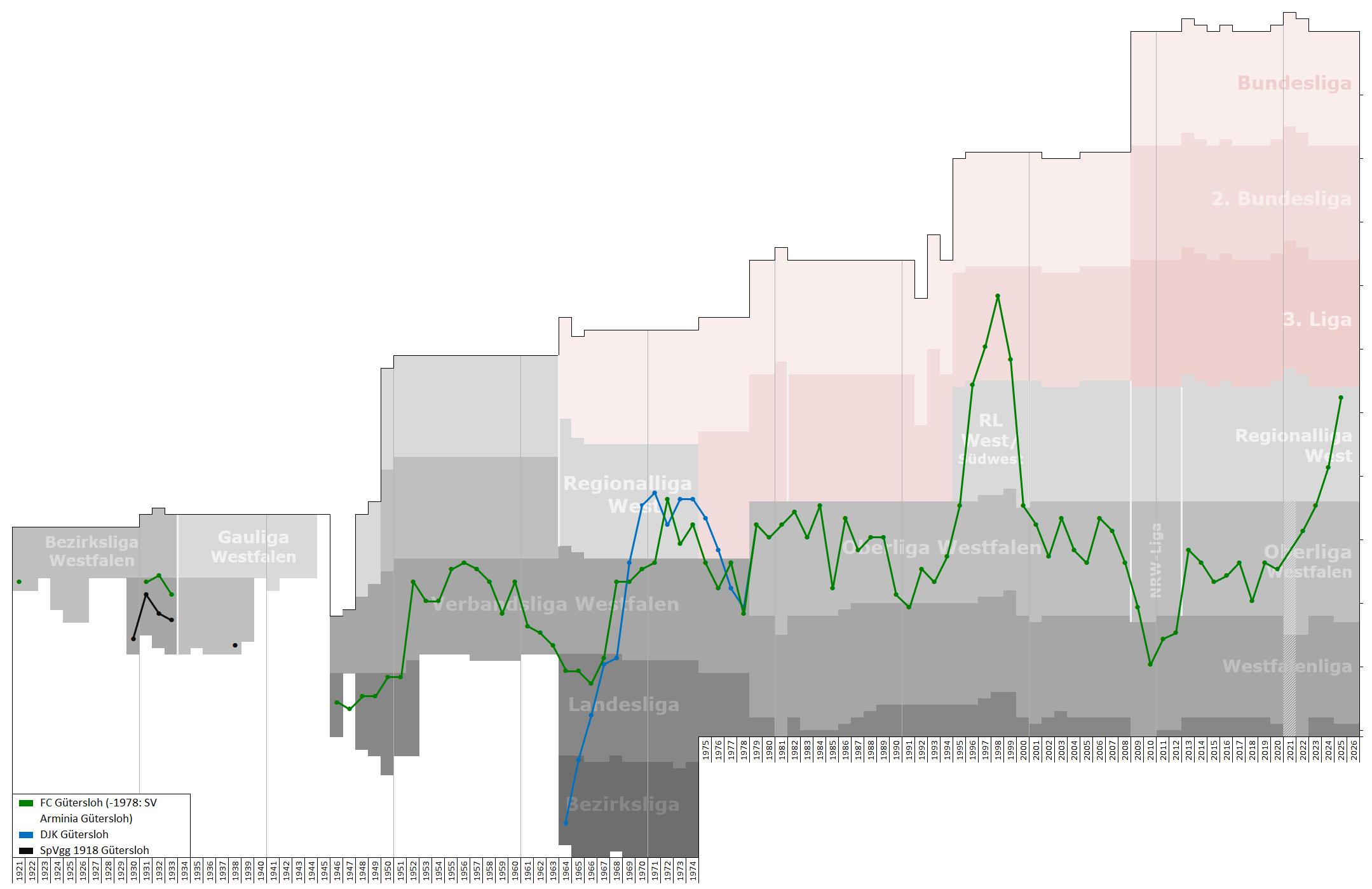
Chart of end-season table positions of FC Gütersloh in the football league system of Germany

The club's honours:

- Regionalliga West/Südwest
  - Champions: 1996
- Oberliga Westfalen
  - Champions: 1984, 1995
- Westfalenliga – Group 1
  - Champions: 1991
- Westphalia Cup
  - Winners: 2023

== Current squad ==
As of 8 September 2026

Note: Flags indicate national team as defined under FIFA eligibility rules; some limited exceptions apply. Players may hold more than one non-FIFA nationality.

No.	Pos.	Nation	Player
4	DF	GER	Niklas Barthel
5	DF	GER	Niklas Möllers
6	MF	GER	Björn Rother
7	MF	GER	Jan-Lukas Liehr
8	MF	GER	Phil Beckhoff
9	FW	GER	Paolo Maiella
10	FW	GER	Julius Langfeld
12	GK	GER	Tim Matuschewsky
13	GK	GER	Jarno Peters
15	MF	GER	Len Wilkesmann
17	DF	GER	David Winke
18	MF	CZE	Patrik Twardzik

No.	Pos.	Nation	Player
19	MF	GER	Kevin Hoffmeier
22	DF	GER	Justin Lukas
23	DF	GER	Kevin Hingerl
25	MF	GER	Hannes John
27	MF	GER	Aleksandar Kandic
28	MF	GER	Erik Lanfer
31	GK	GER	Roman Schabbing
33	DF	GER	Fynn Arkenberg
34	DF	GER	Jannik Borgmann
35	FW	GER	Niklas Frese
44	DF	GER	Jannis Wagner

== Notable players ==
- (Germany) Kemal Halat

== Gallery ==
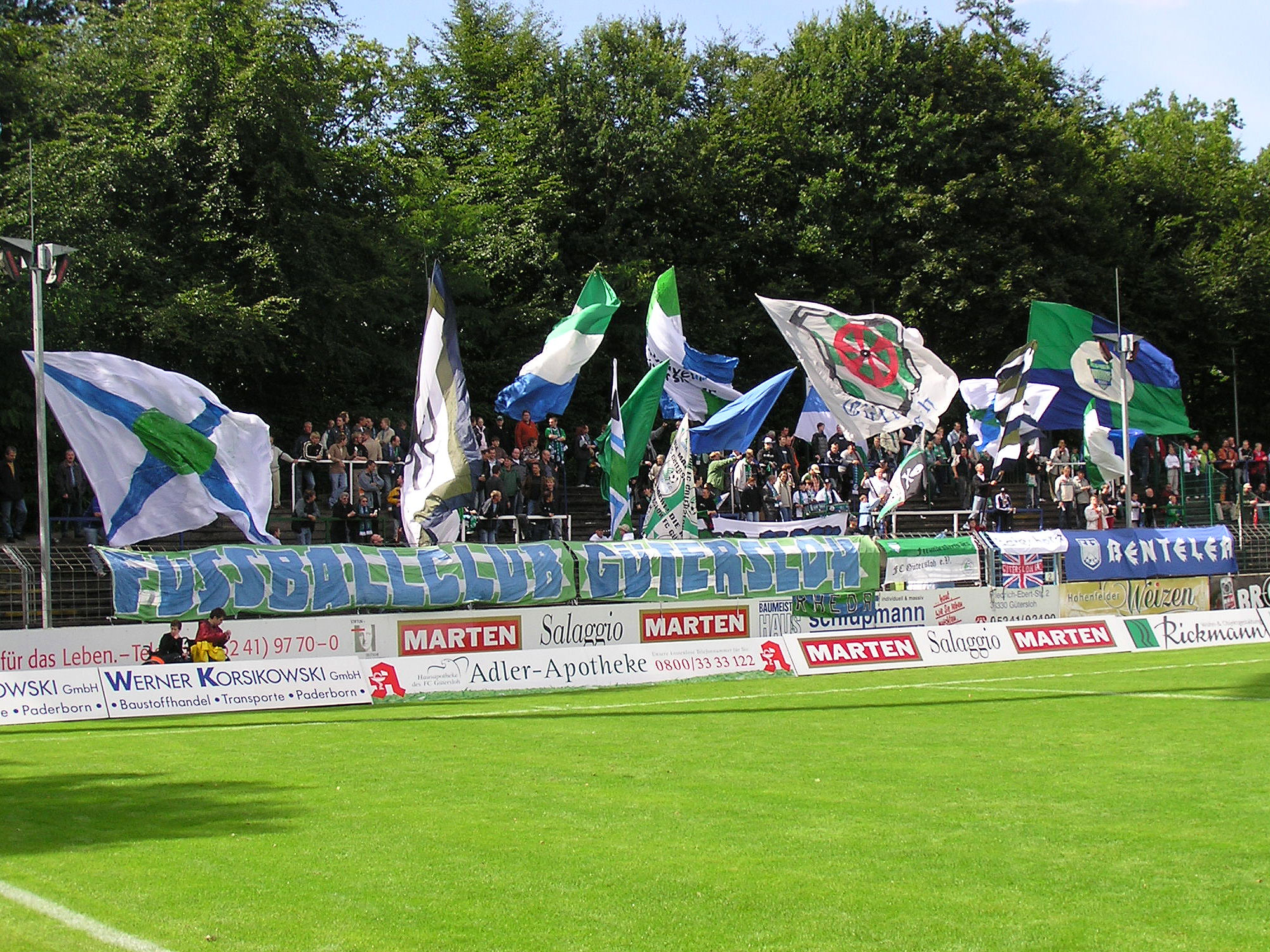
FCG supporters

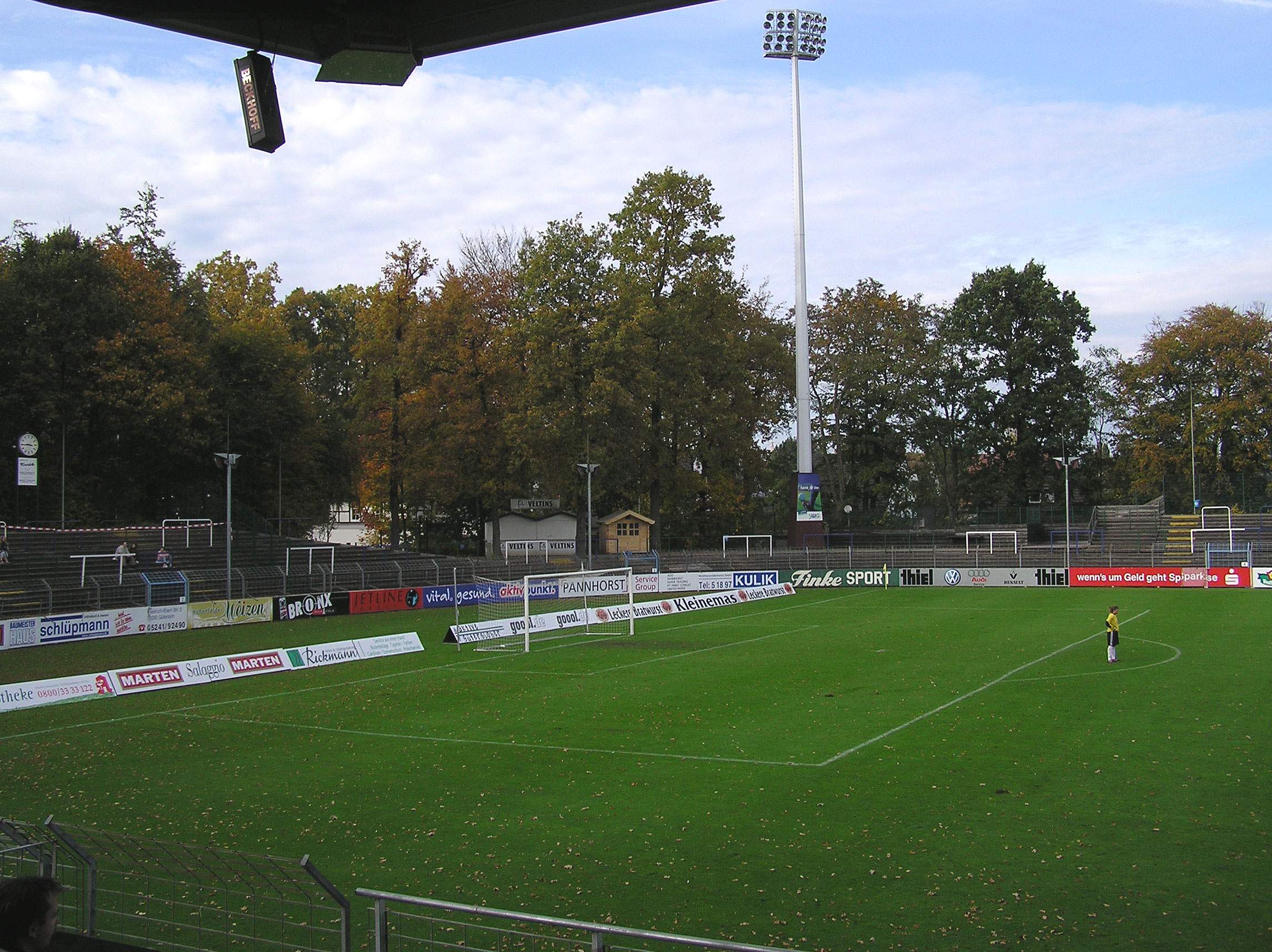
Heidewaldstadion

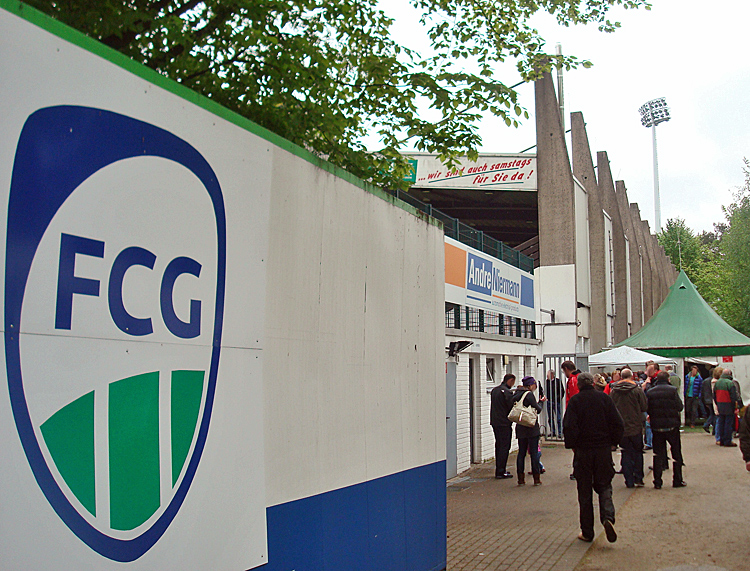
Behind the stands
