= Stefan Schürf =

German footballer

Personal information
- Date of birth: 8 March 1989 (age 37)
- Place of birth: Munich, West Germany
- Height: 1.76 m (5 ft 9 in)
- Position: Right-back

Youth career
- –2001: TSV Forstenried
- 2001–2008: Bayern Munich

Senior career*
Years	Team	Apps	(Gls)
2008–2011	Bayern Munich II	25	(0)
Total		25	(0)

International career
2009	Germany U-20	2	(0)
- * Club domestic league appearances and goals

Stefan Schürf (born 8 March 1989) is a German former footballer who played for Bayern Munich II.

Schürf joined Bayern Munich from TSV Forstenried as a 12-year-old, and progressed through the junior team into the reserves, making his professional debut in a 3. Liga match against Stuttgarter Kickers in March 2009, coming on as a substitute for Manuel Duhnke. He was named in Bayern's first-team squad for the 2009–10 UEFA Champions League, where he was assigned the number 24. After 25 games in the 3rd Liga, all in 2009, Schürf suffered an anterior cruciate ligament injury midway through the 2009–10 season, which ruled him out for the rest of the campaign. He missed the entirety of the 2010–11 season, and announced his retirement from the game in June 2011.
