= Thomas Hagn =

German footballer

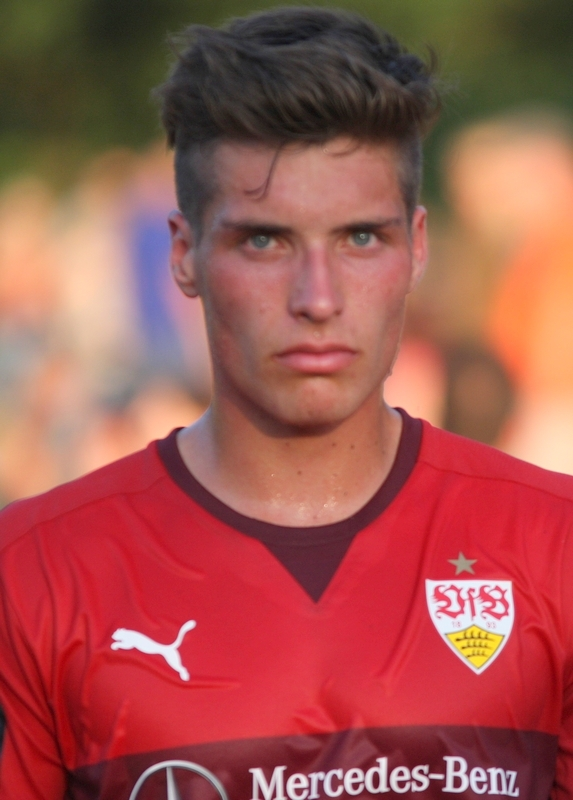

Personal information
- Date of birth: 28 February 1995 (age 31)
- Place of birth: Freising, Germany
- Height: 1.85 m (6 ft 1 in)
- Position: Left-back

Youth career
- SE Freising
- TSV Allershausen
- –2014: Bayern Munich
- 2014: SpVgg Unterhaching

Senior career*
Years	Team	Apps	(Gls)
2014–2015	SpVgg Unterhaching	29	(1)
2014	→ SpVgg Unterhaching II	3	(0)
2015–2017	VfB Stuttgart II	38	(1)
2017–2019	SpVgg Unterhaching	37	(4)

International career
2014–2015	Germany U20	7	(0)
- * Club domestic league appearances and goals as of 18:23, 7 May 2020 (UTC)

Thomas Hagn (born 28 February 1995) is a German footballer.

== Career ==
On 8 July 2015 Hagn moved to VfB Stuttgart II.

== Career statistics ==
As of matches played on 12 December 2018.

Club	Season	League		
Club	Season	Division	Apps	Goals
Unterhaching	2013–14	3. Liga	2	0
Unterhaching	2014–15	3. Liga	11	0
Unterhaching	Totals		13	0
Stuttgart II	2015–16	3. Liga	17	1
Stuttgart II	2016–17	Regionalliga Südwest	21	0
Stuttgart II	Totals		38	1
Unterhaching	2017–18	3. Liga	18	4
Unterhaching	2018–19	3. Liga	9	0
Unterhaching	Totals		27	4
Career totals			78	5
