= Tugay (name) =

Tugay is a name of Turkish origin which is used as a masculine given name and a surname. It was first used in 1934 and means a military unit in the Turkish army.

Notable people with the name are as follows:

== Given name ==
- Tugay Alizada (born 2002), Ukrainian-born Azerbaijani football player
- Tugay Bey (died 1651), Turkic ruler
- Tugay Kaçar (born 1994), Turkish football player
- Tugay Kerimoğlu (born 1970), Turkish football player
- Tugay Uzan (born 1994), Turkish football player

== Surname ==
- Hulusi Fuat Tugay (1890–1967), Turkish military doctor and diplomat
- Mine Tugay (born 1978), Turkish actress
