= Tugai (disambiguation) =

Tugai may refer to:

- Tugay, a form of riparian forest or woodland
- Tǔgǎi, Chinese abbreviation for Land Reform Movement (China)
- Theodor Antonius Tugai (1912 – 2000), better known as Teuvo Tulio, Finnish film director and actor
- Mohamed Amine Tougai, Algerian footballer

== See also ==
- Tugay (disambiguation)
