= Jannik Borgmann =

German footballer (born 1997)

Personal information
- Date of birth: 12 November 1997 (age 28)
- Place of birth: Germany
- Height: 1.96 m (6 ft 5 in)
- Position: Defender

Team information
- Current team: FC Gütersloh
- Number: 34

Youth career
- –2014: VfL Osnabrück
- 2014–2015: Preußen Münster
- 2015–2016: VfL Osnabrück

Senior career*
Years	Team	Apps	(Gls)
2016–2022	Preußen Münster II		
2018–2022	Preußen Münster	52	(4)
2022–2024	Rot Weiss Ahlen	43	(3)
2024–	FC Gütersloh	45	(5)
- * Club domestic league appearances and goals as of 23 September 2026

Jannik Borgmann (born 12 November 1997) is a German professional footballer who plays as a defender for FC Gütersloh.
