= Heidewaldstadion =

Football stadium in Gütersloh, Germany

Coordinates: 51°53′30″N 8°23′18″E

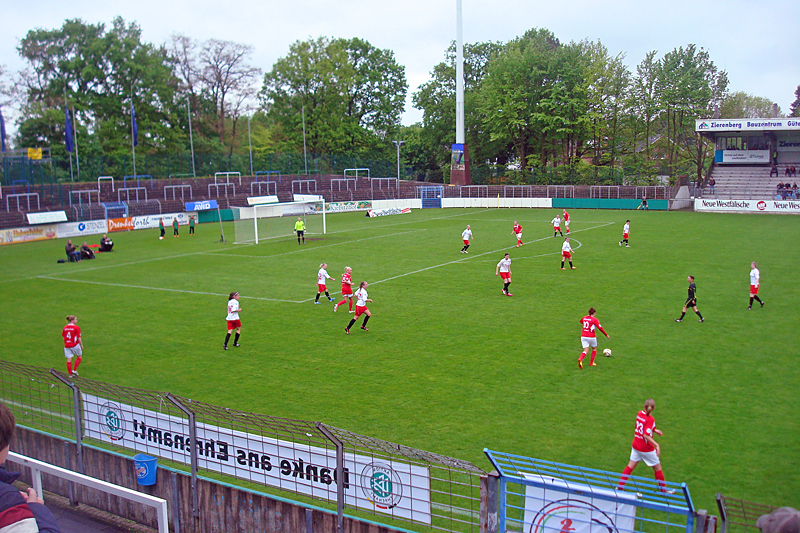
- FSV Gütersloh 2009 vs. Mellendorfer TV
- Interactive map of Heidewaldstadion
- Full name: Heidewaldstadion
- Former names: Adolf-Hitler-Kampfbahn (1933-1945)
- Location: Gütersloh, Germany
- Owner: City of Gütersloh
- Capacity: 8,400

Construction
- Built: 1932/33
- Opened: 1933
- Renovated: 1972, 1997

Tenant
- FC Gütersloh

Heidewaldstadion is an association football stadium in Gütersloh, North Rhine-Westphalia, Germany. It is the biggest football stadium in Kreis Gütersloh and currently has a capacity of 8,400 spectators. It is the home stadium of the FC Gütersloh football team playing in the Oberliga Westfalen. The Heidewaldstadion is located in the Sundern district on the southern outskirts of Gütersloh. The stadium takes its name from the small wooded area to the west of the stadium. The Heidewaldstraße runs south of the stadium, where the V.I.P. parking spaces are also located. In August 2017, the club sold the sponsor name to Energieversum, a Gütersloh-based company from the photovoltaics. The stadium is officially called Energieversum Stadion, for sponsorship reason.

The Portugal national team based their training camp for the 2006 FIFA World Cup finals at Marienfeld in Kreis Gütersloh, so a public training session of the soccer stars took place in Gütersloh. The stadium also hosted a game of the 4th World Football Championships for para-athletes with an intellectual disability (Russia vs. Northern Ireland 0-0).

The Turkey national team prepared for the UEFA Euro 2008 at Marienfeld, too, and had a public training session in the Heidewaldstadion on May, 22nd.

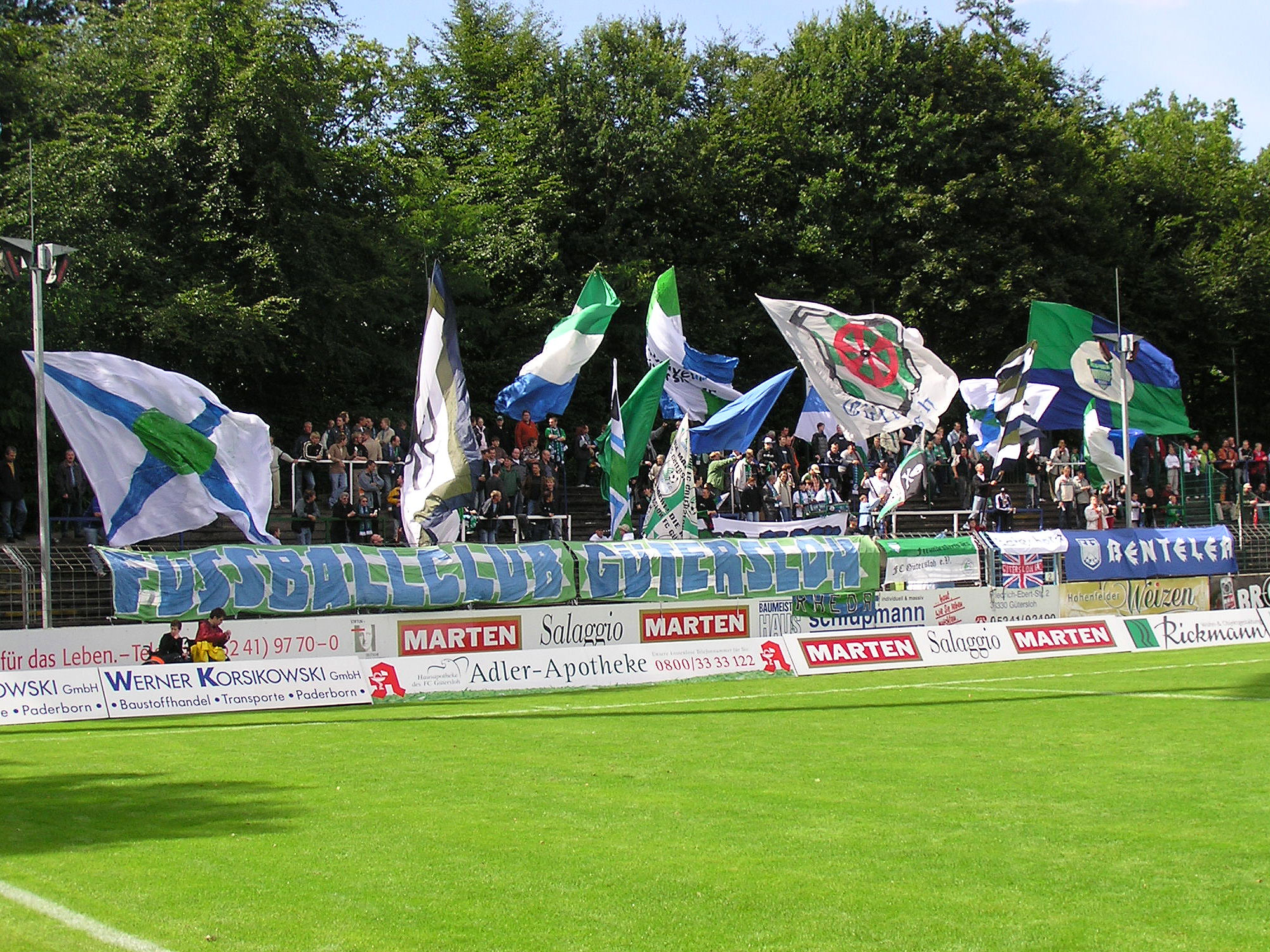
FCG supporters

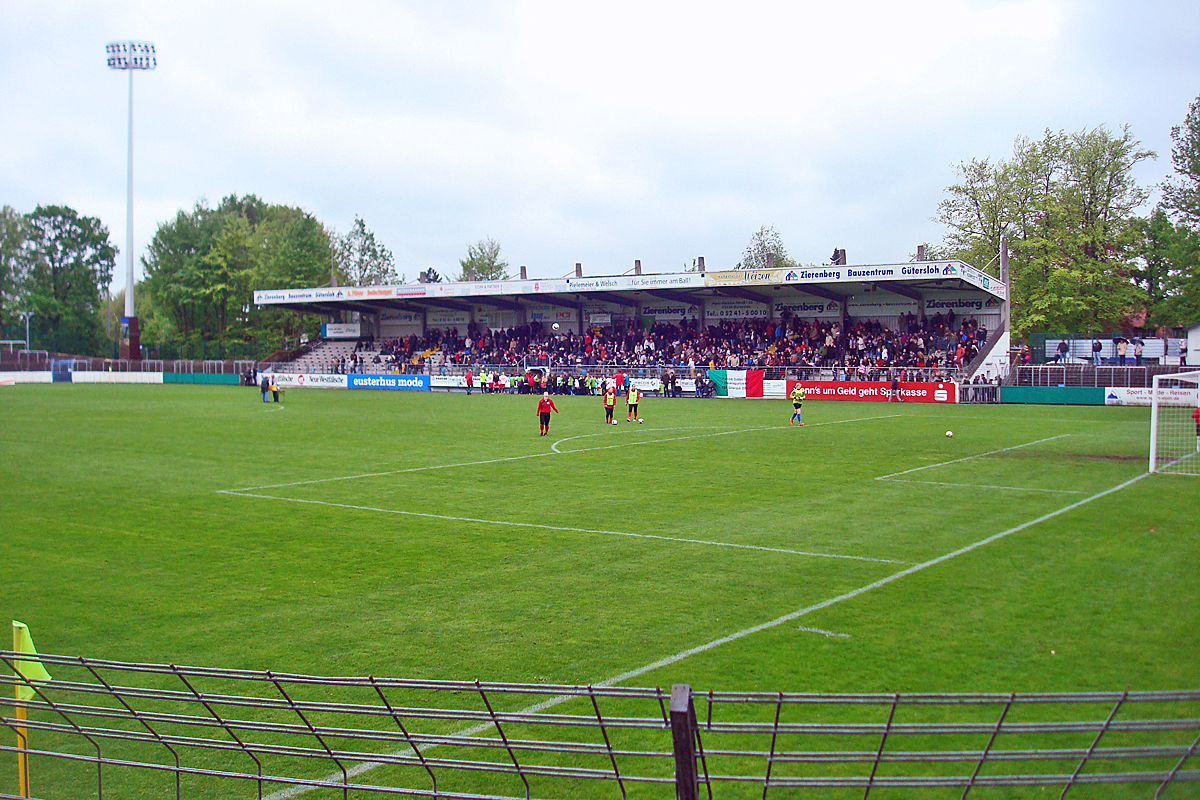
The roofed grandstands with seating for 1,150 spectators

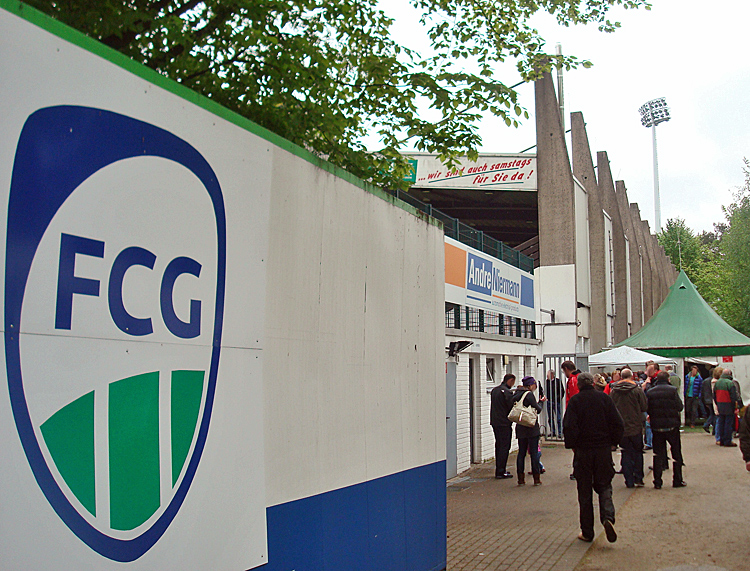
Behind the stands

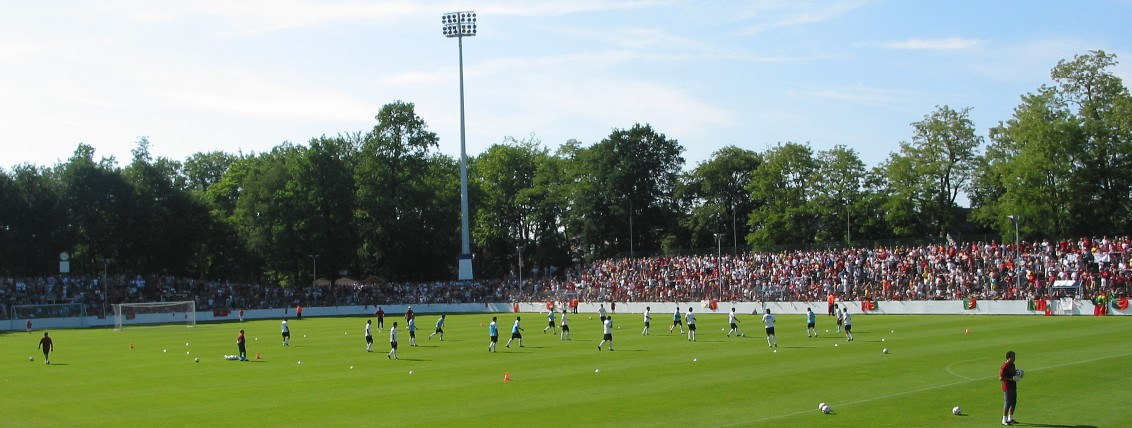
Training session of the Portugal national team, June 2006
