= Josef Welzmüller =

German footballer (born 1990)

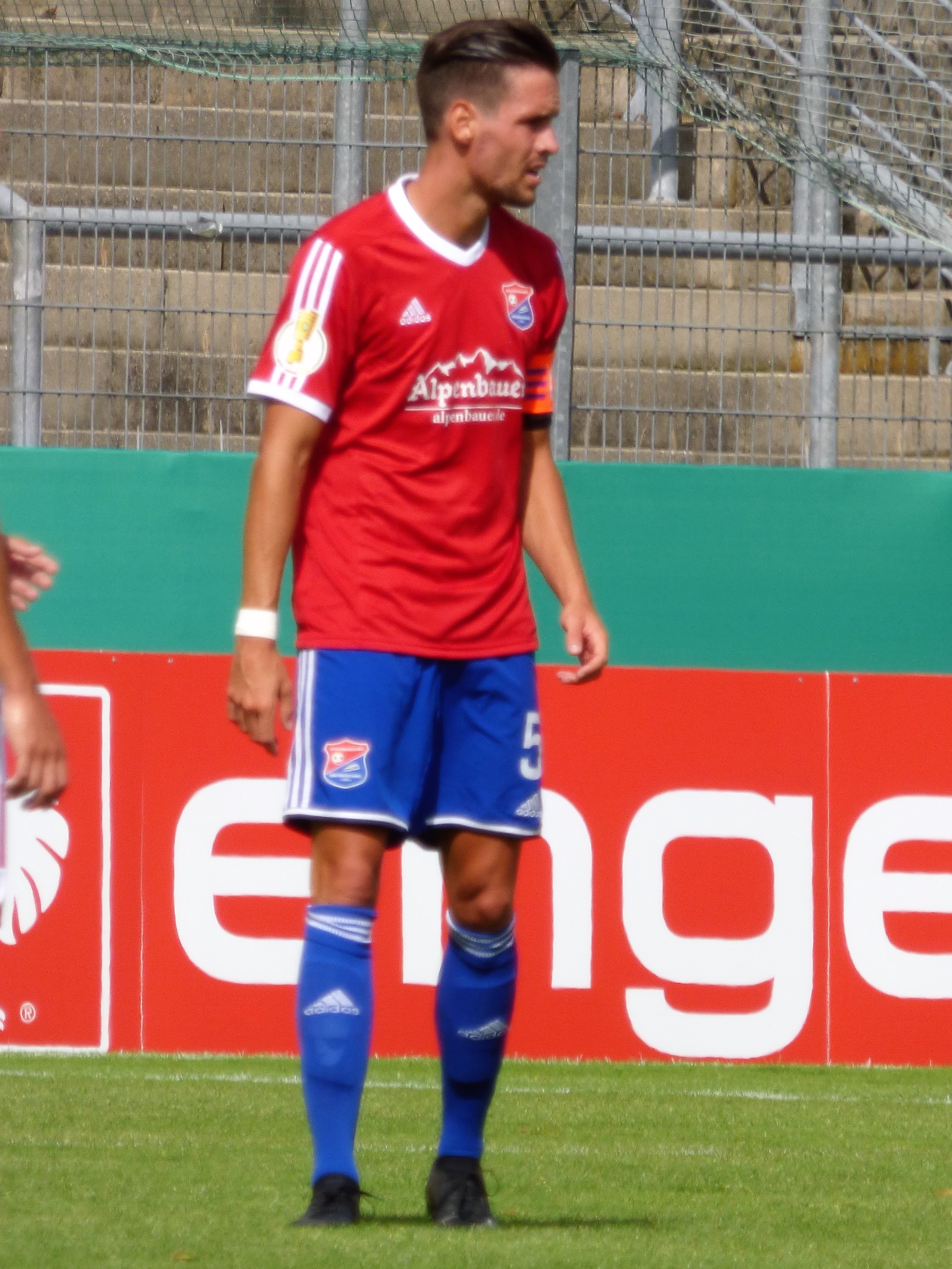
- Welzmüller playing for SpVgg Unterhaching in 2016

Personal information
- Date of birth: 10 January 1990 (age 36)
- Place of birth: Munich, West Germany
- Height: 1.88 m (6 ft 2 in)
- Position: Centre-back

Youth career
- SV Inning
- –2009: SB/DJK Rosenheim

Senior career*
Years	Team	Apps	(Gls)
2009–2012	SC Fürstenfeldbruck	48	(0)
2012–2014	SV Heimstetten	31	(0)
2014	SpVgg Unterhaching II	8	(0)
2014–2024	SpVgg Unterhaching	152	(2)
- * Club domestic league appearances and goals

Josef Welzmüller (born 10 January 1990) is a German former footballer who played as a centre-back.

== Career ==
=== Early years ===
Welzmüller played for SB/DJK Rosenheim until 2009, where he moved to Landesliga Bayern-Südwest club SC Fürstenfeldbruck. He managed to achieve promotion to the Bayernliga with the club in 2012. Ahead of the 2012–13 season, he joined Bayernliga club SV Heimstetten.

=== SpVgg Unterhaching ===
Welzmüller signed with 3. Liga club SpVgg Unterhaching in June 2014. He made his debut for the club on 2 August in a 3–3 home win against Wehen Wiesbaden at Sportpark Unterhaching.

His first goal for the club came on 10 March 2018, a converted penalty kick in the 23rd minute of a 1–1 away draw against SV Meppen.

During his stay with Unterhaching, he was appointed club captain. He has struggled with injuries during his career with the club, tearing his anterior cruciate ligament in September 2018, and again in September 2020. He signed a two-year contract extension with Unterhaching on 4 July 2022, keeping him at the club until 2024.

== Personal life ==
Welzmüller has studied business administration. He is a triplet, and his brothers Maximilian and Lukas are also professional footballers.

== Honours ==
SpVgg Unterhaching

- Regionalliga Bayern: 2022–23
