= Alexander Benede =

German footballer

Personal information
- Full name: Alexander Aquayo Benede
- Date of birth: 20 September 1988 (age 38)
- Place of birth: Munich, West Germany
- Height: 1.81 m (5 ft 11 in)
- Position: Left wing-back

Team information
- Current team: TSV 1860 Munich II
- Number: 24

Youth career
- –2005: TSV 1860 München
- 2005–2007: FC Bayern Munich

Senior career*
Years	Team	Apps	(Gls)
2007–2009	FC Bayern Munich II	13	(0)
2010–2011	TSV Aindling	32	(0)
2011–2014	BC Aichach	61	(7)
2014–2021	SV Pullach	173	(5)
2021–2024	TSV Landsberg	75	(2)
2024–	TSV 1860 Munich II	1	(0)

International career
2006	Germany U-18	5	(0)
- * Club domestic league appearances and goals as of 20 July 2024

Alexander Aquayo Benede (born 20 September 1988) is a German footballer who plays as a left wing-back for TSV 1860 Munich II in Bayernliga.

== Career ==
Benede began his career in the youth team of TSV 1860 München, before moving to cross-town rivals FC Bayern in 2005. After two years in Bayern's youth team, he was promoted to the reserve team. He made 13 appearances before being released in 2009. He spent a year without a club before joining Aindling in July 2010. One year later, he signed for BC Aichach.

Benede is a versatile player, most at home on the left flank. In the earlier part of his career, he was a forward, but more recently he has been used in more defensive roles.

== Personal life ==
His adoptive father is leader of the SOS Project of the Munich Police Department.
