= Liridon Vocaj =

Kosovan footballer

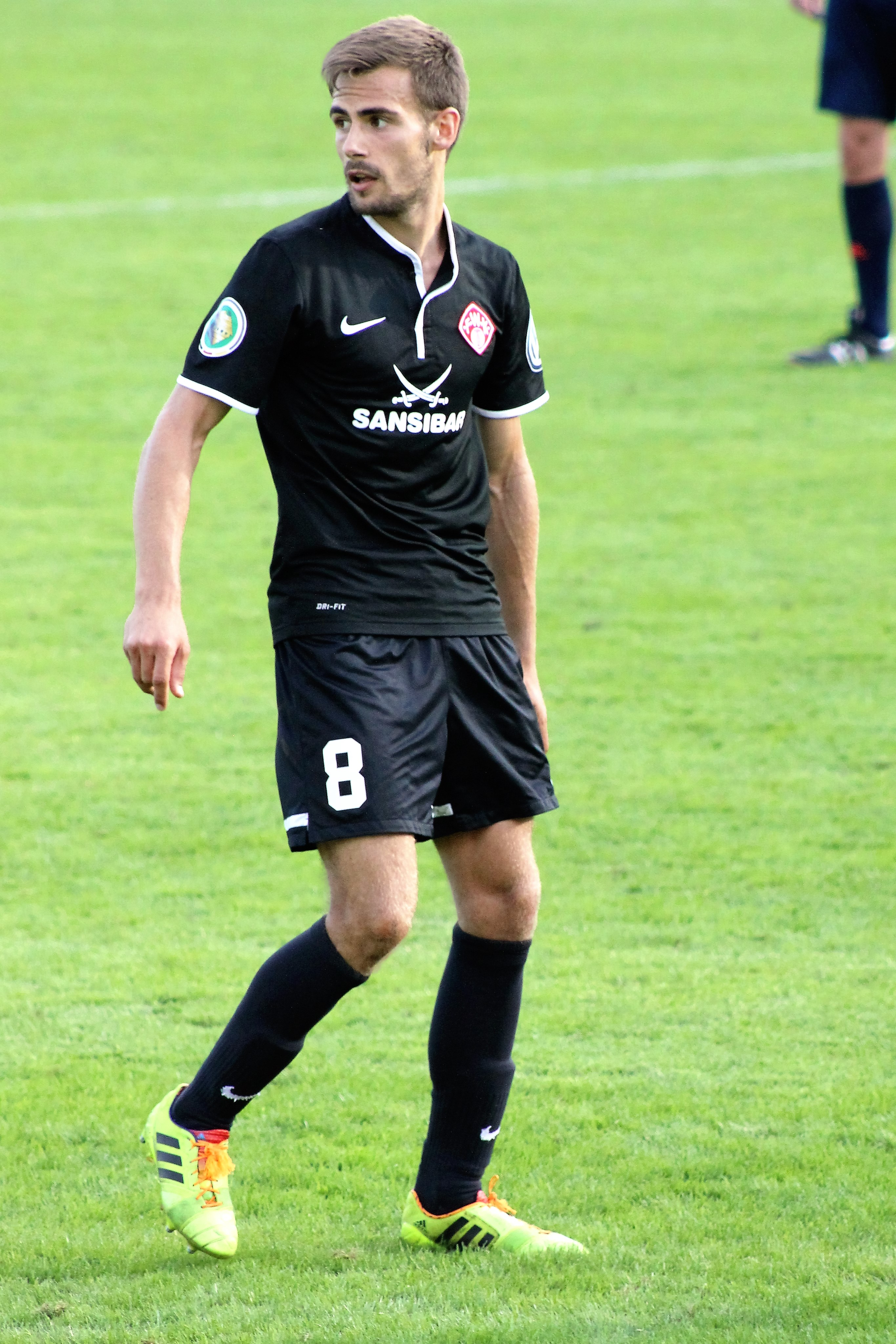
- Vocaj in 2014

Personal information
- Date of birth: 1 October 1993 (age 33)
- Place of birth: Peć, FR Yugoslavia
- Height: 1.81 m (5 ft 11 in)
- Position: Midfielder

Youth career
- 200x–2004: FC Kochelsee-Schlehdorf
- 2004–2012: 1860 Munich

Senior career*
Years	Team	Apps	(Gls)
2012–2014	1860 Munich II	51	(5)
2012–2013	1860 Munich	0	(0)
2014–2016	Würzburger Kickers	43	(1)
2016–2018	Rot-Weiß Erfurt	42	(1)
2019	Chemnitzer FC	0	(0)
- * Club domestic league appearances and goals as of 23:07, 8 May 2019 (UTC)

Liridon Vocaj (born 1 October 1993) is a Kosovan footballer who plays as a midfielder.

== Club career ==
On 25 January 2019, Vocaj joined Chemnitzer FC on a contract for the rest of the season.
