= Jonas Struß =

German footballer

Personal information
- Full name: Jonas Struß
- Date of birth: 26 September 1997 (age 29)
- Place of birth: Hermannsburg, Germany
- Height: 1.88 m (6 ft 2 in)
- Position: Centre-back

Team information
- Current team: BSG Wismut Gera
- Number: 5

Youth career
- TuS Hermannsburg
- SSV Südwinsen
- JFC Allertal
- –2013: Hannover 96
- 2013–2016: Rot-Weiß Erfurt

Senior career*
Years	Team	Apps	(Gls)
2016–2017	Rot-Weiß Erfurt	1	(0)
2017–	BSG Wismut Gera	1	(0)
- * Club domestic league appearances and goals as of 9 August 2017

Jonas Struß (born 26 September 1997) is a German footballer who plays as a centre-back for BSG Wismut Gera.
