= Samir Benamar =

Moroccan footballer

Personal information
- Full name: Samir Benamar
- Date of birth: 23 August 1992 (age 34)
- Place of birth: Nador, Morocco
- Height: 1.82 m (6 ft 0 in)
- Position: Midfielder

Youth career
- VfR Bockenheim
- SV Blau-Gelb Frankfurt

Senior career*
Years	Team	Apps	(Gls)
2012–2013	SpVgg 05 Oberrad		
2013–2014	FSV Frankfurt II	32	(9)
2014–2015	TuS Koblenz	23	(4)
2015–2016	Arminia Bielefeld	0	(0)
2015–2016	Arminia Bielefeld II	9	(2)
2015–2016	→ Rot-Weiß Erfurt (loan)	14	(1)
2016–2018	Rot-Weiß Erfurt	35	(0)
2019–2020	FC Gießen	8	(1)
2020	Difaâ El Jadida	4	(0)
- * Club domestic league appearances and goals as of 19:33, 27 February 2023 (UTC)

Samir Benamar (born 23 August 1992) is a Moroccan footballer.

== Career ==
=== FC Gießen ===
On 2 November 2019, Benamar joined FC Gießen after having been without club since the summer 2018.
