= Marco Höferth =

German footballer (born 1988)

Personal information
- Date of birth: 25 March 1988 (age 38)
- Place of birth: Wertheim, West Germany
- Height: 1.88 m (6 ft 2 in)
- Position: Defender

Team information
- Current team: TuS Holzkirchen
- Number: 13

Youth career
- FC Dörlesberg
- VfB Reicholzheim
- Viktoria Wertheim
- –2005: FV Lauda
- 2005–2006: Bayern Munich

Senior career*
| Years | Team | Apps | (Gls) |
| 2006–2009 | Bayern Munich II | 10 | (0) |
| 2009–2010 | SC Pfullendorf | 11 | (0) |
| 2010–2011 | SpVgg Weiden | 11 | (0) |
| 2011–2016 | BCF Wolfratshausen | 120 | (28) |
| 2016– | TuS Holzkirchen | 66 | (13) |

International career
| | Germany U-18 | 6 | (0) |
- * Club domestic league appearances and goals as of 18:48, 4 January 2019 (UTC)

Marco Höferth (born 25 March 1988 in Wertheim) is a German footballer who currently plays for TuS Holzkirchen. Höferth joined Bayern Munich's youth team in 2005, and a year later he was making his debut for the reserve team, replacing Michael Kokocinski in a Regionalliga Süd match against SV Elversberg. He spent three years playing for Bayern's second team, but only made ten appearances, three of which came in his last season, in the 3. Liga. Following his release, he joined SC Pfullendorf, where he played for a year, before joining SpVgg Weiden in 2010. Before the year was over, though, the club folded, and Höferth, along with the entire squad, was made a free agent, and the twelve appearances he'd made so far were annulled. After six months without a club, Höferth signed for BCF Wolfratshausen in July 2011.
