= Kevin Hingerl =

German footballer (born 1993)

Personal information
- Date of birth: 2 September 1993 (age 33)
- Place of birth: Munich, Germany
- Height: 1.86 m (6 ft 1 in)
- Position: Centre-back

Team information
- Current team: FC Gütersloh
- Number: 23

Youth career
- SpVgg Unterhaching
- SV Pullach
- –2011: SpVgg Unterhaching

Senior career*
Years	Team	Apps	(Gls)
2011–2014	SpVgg Unterhaching	24	(0)
2014–2015	TSV Buchbach	30	(1)
2015–2022	Wacker Burghausen	153	(8)
2022–2023	Türkgücü München	48	(8)
2024–2026	TSV Buchbach	71	(4)
2026–	FC Gütersloh	9	(0)
- * Club domestic league appearances and goals as of 28 June 2026

Kevin Hingerl (born 2 September 1993) is a German footballer who plays as a centre-back for Regionalliga West club FC Gütersloh.
