= Pablo Pigl =

German footballer (born 1992)

Personal information
- Date of birth: 8 February 1992 (age 34)
- Place of birth: Hammelburg, Germany
- Height: 1.82 m (6 ft 0 in)
- Position: Midfielder

Youth career
- –2007: 1. FC Schweinfurt 05
- 2007–2010: Greuther Fürth
- 2010–2011: FC Augsburg

Senior career*
Years	Team	Apps	(Gls)
2011–2014	FC Augsburg II	53	(1)
2014–2015	1. FC Schweinfurt 05	28	(3)
2015–2017	Rot-Weiß Erfurt	37	(1)
2017–2019	Türkgücü-Ataspor	62	(14)
2019–2022	FC Pipinsried	76	(35)
2023	SC Oberweikertshofen	4	(0)
Total		260	(54)

Managerial career
- 2022: FC Pipinsried (assistant)
- 2023: SC Oberweikertshofen
- * Club domestic league appearances and goals

Pablo Pigl (born 8 February 1992) is a German former professional footballer and coach.

== Career ==
Pigl began playing football in the youth department of 1. FC Schweinfurt 05 and joined the youth ranks of SpVgg Greuther Fürth in 2007, where he played for three years. In 2010, he moved to FC Augsburg, where he signed a contract with their second team in 2011. He scored one goal in 53 games for the Augsburg reserves in the Regionalliga Bayern. Ahead of the 2014–15 season he returned to his youth club in Schweinfurt, staying in the same league.

In the summer of 2015, Pigl moved to Rot-Weiß Erfurt on a two-year contract with an option for another year, after having scored three goals in 28 games for Schweinfurt. He made his competitive debut for Erfurt on 24 July 2015 in a match against 1. FC Magdeburg. After his playing time decreased during the 2016–17 season, his contract was terminated in March 2017 after a total of 37 league games, in which he had scored one goal.

Ahead of the 2017–18 season, Pigl joined sixth-tier Landesliga Bayern-Südost club Türkgücü-Ataspor. With the club, he won successive promotions from the Landesliga Bayern-Südost to the Bayernliga in 2018 and to the Regionalliga Bayern in 2019 as champions.

Pigl moved to FC Pipinsried in the Bayernliga prior to the 2019–20 season. There, he became assistant coach in 2022.

After one year without a club, Pigl had a short stint as player-coach for SC Oberweikertshofen in 2023.

== After football ==
Since leaving professional football in 2017, Pigl has worked as a personal trainer while continuing to play football at a lower level. In February 2022, he began working as a personal trainer at ELEMENTS GmbH in Munich.

== Honours ==
Rot-Weiß Erfurt

- Thuringian Cup: 2016–17

Türkgücü-Ataspor

- Landesliga Bayern-Südost: 2017-18
- Bayernliga Süd: 2018–19
