= Andreas Schäffer =

German footballer

Personal information
- Full name: Andreas Schäffer
- Date of birth: 29 May 1984 (age 42)
- Place of birth: Kelheim, West Germany
- Height: 1.76 m (5 ft 9 in)
- Position: Midfielder

Team information
- Current team: TV Riedenburg

Youth career
- SG Post/Süd Regensburg
- Jahn Regensburg

Senior career*
Years	Team	Apps	(Gls)
2003–2011	Jahn Regensburg II	68	(1)
2005–2011	Jahn Regensburg	82	(9)
2011–2013	TSV Bogen	35	(6)
2013	Jahn Regensburg II	5	(0)
2014–2015	TSV Langquaid	14	(2)
2015–	TV Riedenburg	21	(1)

Managerial career
- 2015–: TV Riedenburg
- * Club domestic league appearances and goals

Andreas Schäffer (born 29 May 1984 in Kelheim) is a former professional German footballer who plays for TV 1906 Riedenburg.

Schäffer made 15 appearances for SSV Jahn Regensburg in the 3. Fußball-Liga during his playing career.
