= Tobias Killer =

German footballer

Personal information
- Date of birth: 20 August 1993 (age 33)
- Place of birth: Memmingen, Germany
- Height: 1.82 m (6 ft 0 in)
- Position: Right midfielder

Team information
- Current team: SV Donaustauf
- Number: 23

Youth career
- FC Memmingen
- TSV Altusried
- –2011: 1860 Munich

Senior career*
Years	Team	Apps	(Gls)
2011–2013	1860 Munich II	14	(0)
2013–2015	SpVgg Unterhaching II	40	(9)
2013–2015	SpVgg Unterhaching	14	(1)
2016–2021	FC Ismaning	126	(10)
2021–	SV Donaustauf	0	(0)
- * Club domestic league appearances and goals as of 12 November 2022

Tobias Killer (born 20 August 1993) is a German footballer who plays as a midfielder who plays for Bayernliga club SV Donaustauf. He appeared in the 3. Liga for SpVgg Unterhaching.
