= Michael Marinkovic =

German footballer

Personal information
- Date of birth: 29 August 1991 (age 35)
- Place of birth: Weilheim, Germany
- Position: Striker

Youth career
- TSV 1865 Murnau
- –2012: FT Starnberg 09

Senior career*
Years	Team	Apps	(Gls)
2012–2014	SpVgg Unterhaching	4	(0)
- * Club domestic league appearances and goals as of 9 August 2013

Michael Marinkovic (born 29 August 1991) is a German footballer who is currently a free agent.

== Career ==
Marinkovic began his professional career with SpVgg Unterhaching in 2012 and made his debut for the club in April 2013, as a substitute for Tobias Schweinsteiger in a 1–0 defeat to Rot-Weiss Erfurt in the 3. Liga. He was released by the club at the end of the 2013–14 season.
