= Oliver Stierle =

German footballer

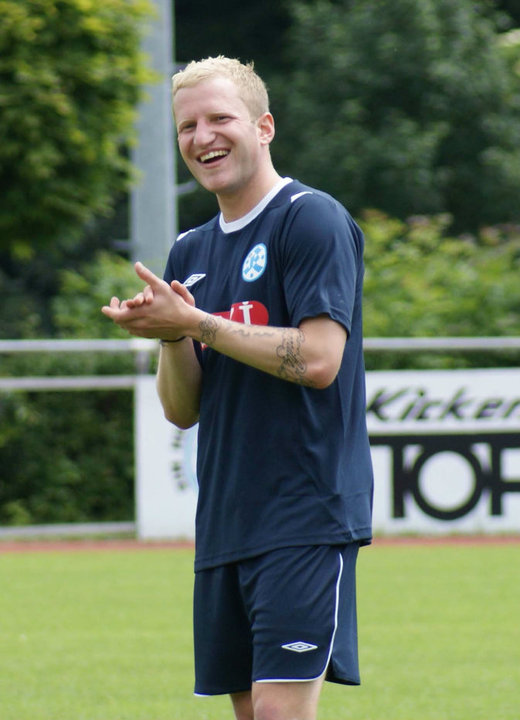
- Stierle in 2010

Personal information
- Date of birth: 13 June 1983 (age 43)
- Place of birth: Stuttgart, West Germany
- Height: 1.76 m (5 ft 9 in)
- Position: Defender

Team information
- Current team: SV Göppingen

Youth career
- 1990–1994: ASV Botnang
- 1994–2000: SpVgg Feuerbach
- 2000–2001: Stuttgarter Kickers

Senior career*
Years	Team	Apps	(Gls)
2001–2008	Stuttgarter Kickers	148	(8)
2008–2010	Bayern Munich II	21	(0)
2010–2013	Stuttgarter Kickers	9	(0)
2013–	SV Göppingen		
- * Club domestic league appearances and goals as of 30 June 2013

Oliver Stierle (born 13 June 1983) is a German footballer who plays for SV Göppingen.

== Position ==
Stierle played as a midfielder for the majority of his career but more recently he has been deployed as a defender.
