= Danilo Dittrich =

German footballer

Personal information
- Date of birth: 15 May 1995 (age 31)
- Place of birth: Ansbach, Germany
- Height: 1.72 m (5 ft 8 in)
- Position: Defensive midfielder

Team information
- Current team: TSV Kornburg
- Number: 13

Youth career
- 1998–2008: SG Herrieden
- 2008–2009: SpVgg Ansbach
- 2009–2013: 1. FC Nürnberg

Senior career*
| Years | Team | Apps | (Gls) |
| 2013–2015 | SpVgg Unterhaching | 40 | (0) |
| 2013–2015 | → SpVgg Unterhaching II | 9 | (1) |
| 2015–2016 | VfL Wolfsburg II | 6 | (0) |
| 2016–2017 | Eintracht Trier | 19 | (1) |
| 2017–2018 | SV Seligenporten | 27 | (2) |
| 2018–2020 | Rot-Weiß Erfurt | 27 | (1) |
| 2020– | TSV Kornburg | 6 | (2) |
- * Club domestic league appearances and goals as of 00:28, 20 December 2020 (UTC)

Danilo Ditrich (born 15 May 1995) is a German footballer who plays as a defensive midfielder for TSV Kornburg.
