= Theodor Bergmann (footballer) =

German professional footballer

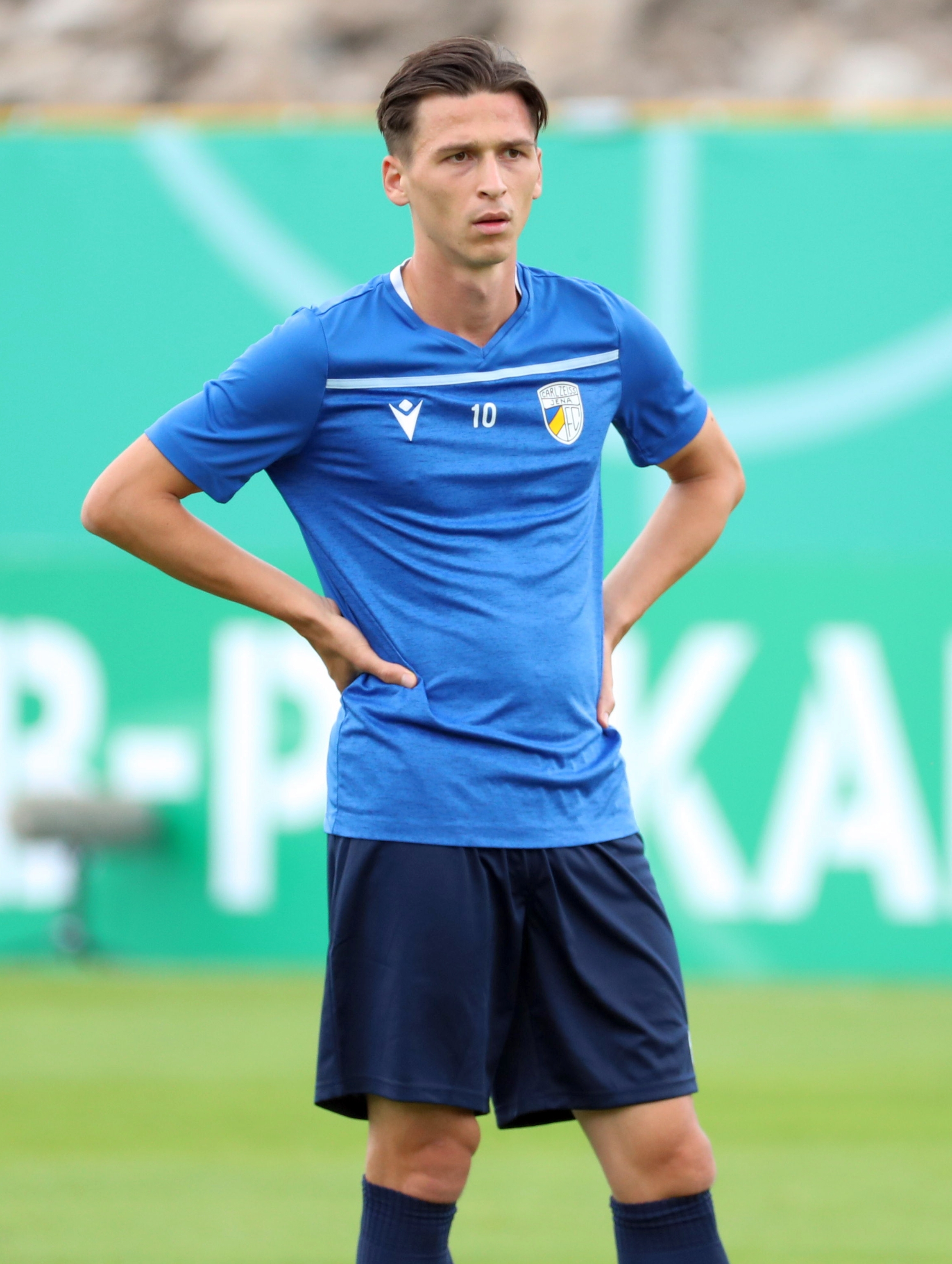
- Bergmann with Jena in August 2021

Personal information
- Date of birth: 8 November 1996 (age 29)
- Place of birth: Bad Langensalza, Germany
- Height: 1.81 m (5 ft 11 in)
- Position: Midfielder

Youth career
- –2015: Rot-Weiß Erfurt

Senior career*
Years	Team	Apps	(Gls)
2015–2018	Rot-Weiß Erfurt	65	(3)
2015–2018	Rot-Weiß Erfurt II	10	(1)
2018–2020	1. FC Kaiserslautern	30	(2)
2020–2022	Carl Zeiss Jena	27	(0)
2022	BFC Dynamo	12	(0)
Total		144	(6)
- * Club domestic league appearances and goals

Theodor Bergmann (born 8 November 1996) is a German former professional footballer who played as a midfielder.

== Career ==
In 2020, Bergmann joined Regionalliga Nordost club Carl Zeiss Jena from 3. Liga side 1. FC Kaiserslautern. He signed a one-year contract with the option of a second.
