= Luka Marino Odak =

Croatian-German footballer

Luka Odak
Personal information
- Full name: Luka Marino Odak
- Date of birth: 22 November 1989 (age 36)
- Place of birth: Frankfurt, Germany
- Height: 1.76 m (5 ft 9 in)
- Position: Right-back

Team information
- Current team: FC Pipinsried
- Number: 17

Youth career
- TSV Forstenried
- –2007: Bayern Munich
- 2007–2008: MSV Duisburg

Senior career*
Years	Team	Apps	(Gls)
2008–2010	MSV Duisburg II	64	(9)
2010–2012	Ingolstadt 04 II	56	(1)
2012–2013	SpVgg Unterhaching	26	(0)
2013–2018	Rot-Weiß Erfurt	140	(0)
2018–2019	Türkgücü München	28	(1)
2019–	FC Pipinsried	0	(0)
- * Club domestic league appearances and goals as of 01:02, 1 November 2019 (UTC)

Luka Marino Odak (born 22 November 1989) is a Croatian-German footballer who plays as a right-back for FC Pipinsried.

== Career ==
Odak began his career in Bayern Munich's youth team before being released in 2007, and having spells with MSV Duisburg and FC Ingolstadt 04, playing for both clubs' reserve teams. In 2012, he returned to Munich to sign for SpVgg Unterhaching, and made his 3. Liga debut in a 2–0 win over SV Wehen Wiesbaden, as a substitute for Marcel Kappelmaier. A year later he moved to Rot-Weiß Erfurt.
