= Tobias Damm =

German footballer

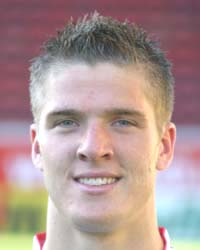
- Damm in 2006

Personal information
- Date of birth: 30 October 1983 (age 43)
- Place of birth: Homberg (Efze), West Germany
- Height: 1.85 m (6 ft 1 in)
- Position: Striker

Team information
- Current team: KSV Hessen Kassel (manager)

Youth career
- FC Homberg

Senior career*
Years	Team	Apps	(Gls)
2003–2004	TSV Wabern		
2004–2005	1. FC Schwalmstadt		
2005–2006	Mainz 05 II	33	(13)
2005–2006	Mainz 05	9	(1)
2007–2010	Wuppertaler SV Borussia	119	(33)
2010–2017	Hessen Kassel	194	(40)
2012–2019	Hessen Kassel II	5	(3)

Managerial career
- 2019–2023: KSV Hessen Kassel
- * Club domestic league appearances and goals

Tobias Damm (born 30 October 1983) is a German football manager and a former player. He spent two seasons in the Bundesliga with 1. FSV Mainz 05.

== Coaching career ==
On 9 October 2019, Damm was appointed Manager (association football)manager of KSV Hessen Kassel, where he spent many years as a player. On 19 December 2019, he extended his contract until 30 June 2021.

After six defeats in seven league games ahe was dismissed at the end of October 2023.
