= Florian Bichler =

German footballer

Personal information
- Date of birth: July 18, 1991 (age 35)
- Place of birth: Weilheim, Germany
- Height: 1.72 m (5 ft 8 in)
- Position: Left winger

Team information
- Current team: TSV Steinbach
- Number: 11

Youth career
- SV Helfendorf
- SpVgg Unterhaching
- –2010: TSV 1860 Rosenheim

Senior career*
Years	Team	Apps	(Gls)
2009–2011	TSV 1860 Rosenheim	19	(5)
2011–2013	SpVgg Greuther Fürth II	37	(2)
2013–2015	SpVgg Unterhaching II	15	(4)
2013–2015	SpVgg Unterhaching	37	(5)
2015–2016	Rot-Weiß Erfurt	22	(0)
2016–2018	SV Elversberg	62	(10)
2018–2020	Rot-Weiß Erfurt	34	(5)
2020–	TSV Steinbach	13	(3)
- * Club domestic league appearances and goals as of 12:59, 30 December 2020 (UTC)

Florian 'Bichi' Bichler (born July 18, 1991) is a German footballer who plays for TSV Steinbach Haiger.

Though two-footed, he is predominantly a left-sided midfielder. He is 172 cm (5 feet 8 3/4 inches) tall and weighs 70 kg (154 lbs). His nickname is Bichi.

== Career ==
He made his debut for SpVgg Unterhaching in April 2013, as a substitute for Dominik Rohracker in a 1–0 defeat to Rot-Weiss Erfurt in the 3. Liga.

He joined SpVgg Unterhaching for a fee of €75,000 from SpVgg Greuther Fürth II on 1 January 2013. Prior to that, he played for TSV 1860 Rosenheim.
