= Salvatore Amirante =

Italian footballer (born 1984)

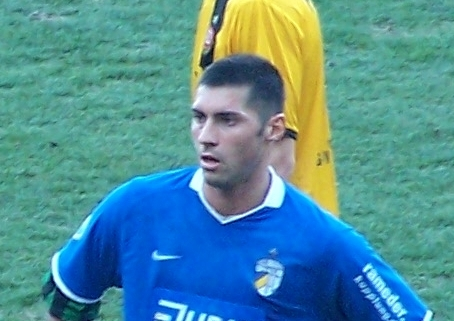
- Salvatore Amirante in 2009

Personal information
- Date of birth: 24 June 1984 (age 42)
- Place of birth: Genoa, Italy
- Height: 1.85 m (6 ft 1 in)
- Position: Striker

Team information
- Current team: Savona

Youth career
- 1999–2004: Sampdoria

Senior career*
Years	Team	Apps	(Gls)
2004–2007	Sestrese	54	(14)
2007–2008	Schaffhausen	21	(4)
2008–2009	Carl Zeiss Jena	44	(15)
2010–2011	Germania Windeck	14	(9)
2011–2012	Savona	4	(1)
2013	FC Viktoria Köln	2	(0)
2014	Lavagnese	23	(14)
2014–2015	Padova	0	(0)
2016–	Savona		
- * Club domestic league appearances and goals as of 1 July 2015

Salvatore Amirante (born 24 June 1984) is an Italian footballer who plays as a striker for Savona.

== Career ==
Born in Genoa, Amirante began his career in 1999 for the youth division of U.C. Sampdoria and after five years joined F.S. Sestrese Calcio 1919 where he played his first senior matches. After three years with Sestrese Amirante left the club and signed on with the Swiss football club FC Schaffhausen.

He only played 21 games for Schaffhausen, scoring four goals. After one season Amirante left Schaffhausen to sign on with FC Carl Zeiss Jena. On 9 August 2009, he scored four goals in twenty-eight minutes for FC Carl Zeiss Jena in the Match against FC Bayern München II. He was released from his contract with Carl Zeiss Jena on 12 October 2009. Although Carl Zeiss Jena consequently withdrew their petition for an immediate annulment of his contract, on 21 December 2009 the club announced that Amirante had nonetheless decided to discontinue his employment.

After one month without a club signed a half-year contract for TSV Germania Windeck.

In January 2014, he joined U.S.D. Lavagnese 1919.

In December 2014, Amirante signed for Biancoscudati Padova. The club obtained the rights to use the original name, "Calcio Padova" in July 2015.

== Honours ==
Padova

- 2014–15 Serie D: Champions
