= Turgai =

Turgai (/tɜːrˈɡaɪ/ tur-GY – from Kazakh torğai 'sparrow') may refer to:

- Turgay Oblast (Russian Empire) – an administrative unit of the Russian Empire
- Torgay Region – a former administrative unit in Kazakhstan
- Turgay (river) – a river-valley system in Kazakhstan
- Turgai Sea (or Turgai Strait) – a body of salt water of the Mesozoic and Cenozoic Eras
