= Maximilian Welzmüller =

German footballer (born 1990)

Personal information
- Date of birth: 10 January 1990 (age 36)
- Place of birth: Munich, Germany
- Height: 1.78 m (5 ft 10 in)
- Position: Defensive midfielder

Youth career
- –2008: SC Fürstenfeldbruck
- 2008–2009: 1860 Munich

Senior career*
Years	Team	Apps	(Gls)
2009–2010	FSV Frankfurt II	33	(5)
2010–2012	Greuther Fürth II	55	(2)
2012–2014	SpVgg Unterhaching	68	(7)
2014–2018	VfR Aalen	106	(6)
2018–2022	Bayern Munich II	96	(2)
2022–2024	SpVgg Unterhaching	41	(0)
- * Club domestic league appearances and goals

Maximilian Welzmüller (born 10 January 1990) is a German former professional footballer who played as a defensive midfielder.

== Career ==
=== Early career ===
In his youth, Welzmüller played for SC Fürstenfeldbruck and 1860 Munich before moving to FSV Frankfurt II.

=== Greuther Fürth ===
In 2010, Welzmüller moved to the youth teams of Greuther Fürth. He made his debut on 8 August 2010 against SV Wehen Wiesbaden II. He came on in the 80th minute, replacing Ronny Philp.

=== SpVgg Unterhaching ===
In July 2012, Welzmüller moved to 3. Liga club SpVgg Unterhaching. He made his league debut on 21 July 2012 in a 0–0 draw with Darmstadt 98. He scored his first league goal about two months later in a 3–2 win over Arminia Bielefeld on 1 September 2012. The goal came in the 39th minute.

=== VfR Aalen ===
On 6 May 2014, Welzmüller moved to 2. Bundesliga side VfR Aalen signing a two-year contract. He made his league debut for Aalen in a 2–0 loss against SV Sandhausen on 28 February 2015. He was replaced by Andreas Hofmann in the 78th minute. He scored his first league goal for the club a year-and-a-half later with the lone goal in victory over Holstein Kiel. The goal came in the 87th minute.

=== Return to Unterhaching ===
On 29 May 2022, Welzmüller agreed to return to SpVgg Unterhaching.

== Personal life ==
His brothers, Lukas and Josef, play for SV Mehring and SpVgg Unterhaching respectively.

== Career statistics ==
Appearances and goals by club, season and competition
Club	Season	League			DFB-Pokal		Other		Total	
Club	Season	Division	Apps	Goals	Apps	Goals	Apps	Goals	Apps	Goals
Greuther Fürth II	2010–11	Regionalliga Süd	29	1	—		—		c29	1
Greuther Fürth II	2011–12	Regionalliga Süd	26	1	—		—		26	1
Greuther Fürth II	Total		55	2	0	0	0	0	55	2
SpVgg Unterhaching	2012–13	3. Liga	35	2	1	0	—		36	2
SpVgg Unterhaching	2013–14	3. Liga	33	5	—		—		33	5
SpVgg Unterhaching	Total		68	7	1	0	0	0	69	7
VfR Aalen	2014–15	2. Bundesliga	2	0	1	0	—		3	0
VfR Aalen	2015–16	3. Liga	34	0	1	0	—		35	0
VfR Aalen	2016–17	3. Liga	38	4	—		—		38	4
VfR Aalen	2017–18	3. Liga	32	2	—		—		32	2
VfR Aalen	Total		106	6	2	0	0	0	108	6
Bayern Munich II	2018–19	Regionalliga Bayern	28	0	—		—		28	0
Bayern Munich II	2019–20	3. Liga	32	0	—		—		32	0
Bayern Munich II	2020–21	3. Liga	22	1	—		—		22	1
Bayern Munich II	2021–22	Regionalliga Bayern	14	1	—		—		14	1
Bayern Munich II	Total		96	2	0	0	0	0	96	2
SpVgg Unterhaching	2022–23	3. Liga	16	0	—		—		16	0
SpVgg Unterhaching	2023–24	3. Liga	25	0	1	0	—		26	0
SpVgg Unterhaching	Total		41	0	1	0	0	0	42	0
Career total			366	17	4	0	0	0	370	17

== Honours ==
SpVgg Unterhaching

- Regionalliga Bayern: 2022–23
