= Tugay Uzan =

Turkish footballer (born 1994)

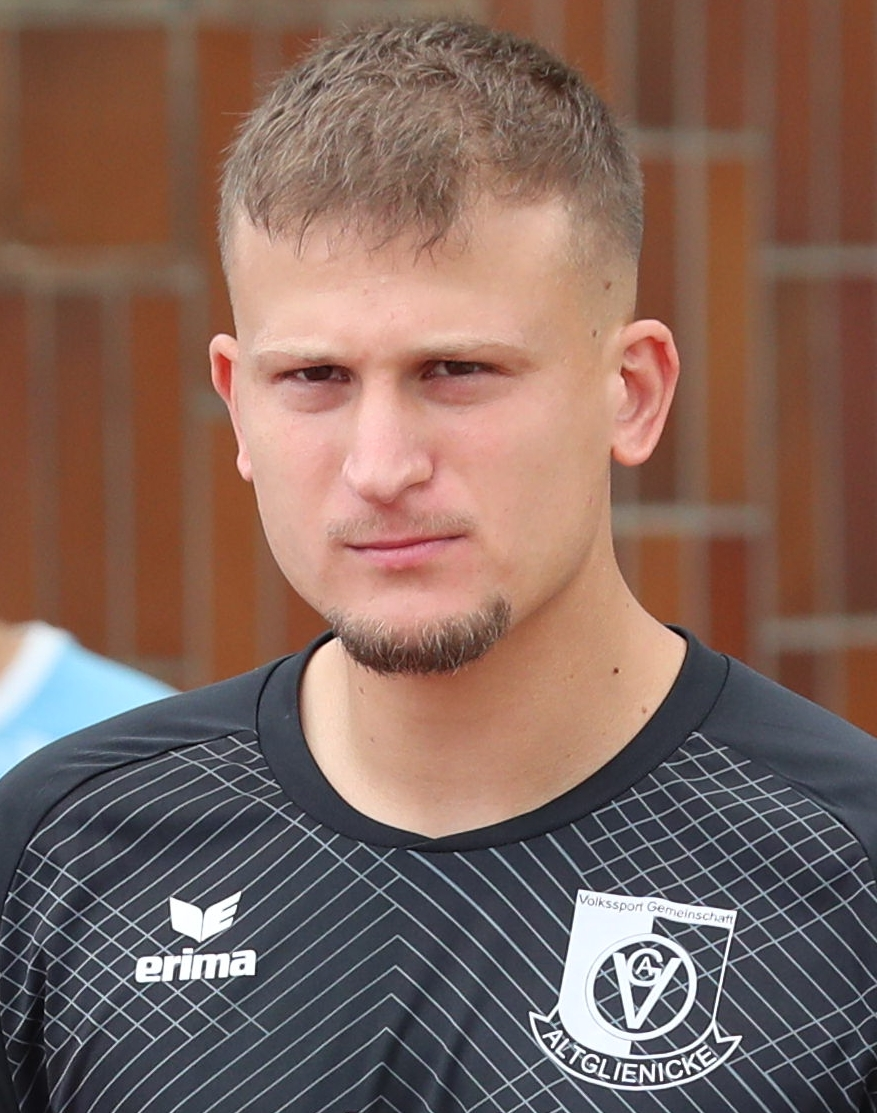

Personal information
- Full name: Tugay Oğulay Uzan
- Date of birth: 27 February 1994 (age 32)
- Place of birth: Berlin, Germany
- Height: 1.80 m (5 ft 11 in)
- Position: Forward

Team information
- Current team: BFC Preussen

Youth career
- SC Siemensstadt
- Hertha BSC
- –2010: Türkiyemspor Berlin
- 2010–2011: Tennis Borussia Berlin
- 2011–2012: Hertha Zehlendorf
- 2012–2013: VfL Wolfsburg

Senior career*
| Years | Team | Apps | (Gls) |
| 2013–2015 | 1. FC Union Berlin II | 54 | (27) |
| 2015–2018 | Rot-Weiß Erfurt | 73 | (13) |
| 2018–2023 | VSG Altglienicke | 123 | (56) |
| 2023–2024 | BFC Dynamo | 13 | (0) |
| 2024– | BFC Preussen | 0 | (0) |

International career^{‡}
| 2012 | Turkey U19 | 2 | (0) |
- * Club domestic league appearances and goals as of 19 May 2024 ‡ National team caps and goals as of 06:58, 21 December 2016 (UTC)

Tugay Oğulay Uzan (born 27 February 1994) is a German and Turkish footballer who plays for BFC Preussen in the NOFV-Oberliga Nord.
