= Marius Duhnke =

German footballer

Personal information
- Date of birth: 20 July 1993 (age 33)
- Place of birth: Würzburg, Germany
- Height: 1.87 m (6 ft 2 in)
- Position: Striker

Team information
- Current team: TSV Ampfing
- Number: 13

Youth career
- FV Karlstadt
- –2009: 1. FC Schweinfurt 05
- 2008–2012: Bayern Munich

Senior career*
Years	Team	Apps	(Gls)
2012–2013	Bayern Munich II	26	(15)
2013–2015	SpVgg Unterhaching II	20	(7)
2013–2015	SpVgg Unterhaching	30	(4)
2015	→ Wacker Burghausen (loan)	11	(1)
2015–2020	Wacker Burghausen	119	(24)
2020–	TSV Ampfing	3	(0)
- * Club domestic league appearances and goals as of 21:27, 30 January 2021 (UTC)

Marius Duhnke (born 20 July 1993) is a German footballer who plays as a striker for TSV Ampfing.

== Career ==
Duhnke played youth football for FV Karlstadt and 1. FC Schweinfurt 05 before joining the Bayern Munich Junior Team in 2008, at the same time that his older brother, Manuel, was signing for the reserve team. He scored prolifically for Bayern's youth teams, including six goals in 35 minutes in an under-17 match against 1860 Munich in 2010, which Bayern won 8–0.

Marius was promoted to the reserve team two years later, although Manuel had since moved on, and made his debut on the opening day of the 2012–13 season, as a substitute for Fabian Hürzeler in a 1–1 draw with FC Augsburg II in the Regionalliga Bayern. He ended the season as Bayern Munich II's top scorer, with fifteen goals, fourteen of which had come in the second half of the season, as the team finished in second place.

Despite this, though, Duhnke left Bayern in July 2013, believing he had little chance of breaking into the first team, and signed for SpVgg Unterhaching of the 3. Liga. He made his debut for the club on the opening day of the 2012–13 season (his 20th birthday) as a substitute for Janik Haberer in a 0–0 draw with Jahn Regensburg.

== Career statistics ==
As of 11 June 2018

Appearances and goals by club, season and competition
Club	Season	League			Cup		Continental		Total		Ref.
Club	Season	Division	Apps	Goals	Apps	Goals	Apps	Goals	Apps	Goals	Ref.
Bayern Munich II	Regionalliga Bayern	2012–13	26	15	—				26	15	
SpVgg Unterhaching	3. Liga	2013–14	29	4	—				29	4	
SpVgg Unterhaching	3. Liga	2014–15	1	0	—				1	0	
SpVgg Unterhaching	Total		30	4	0	0	0	0	30	4	—
Wacker Burghausen	Regionalliga Bayern	2014–15	11	1	—				11	1	
Wacker Burghausen	Regionalliga Bayern	2015–16	32	10	—				32	10	
Wacker Burghausen	Regionalliga Bayern	2016–17	30	3	—				1	0	
Wacker Burghausen	Regionalliga Bayern	2017–18	33	5	—				1	0	
Wacker Burghausen	Total		106	19	0	0	0	0	106	19	—
Career total			162	38	0	0	0	0	162	38	—
