= Daniel Sikorski =

Polish-born Austrian footballer

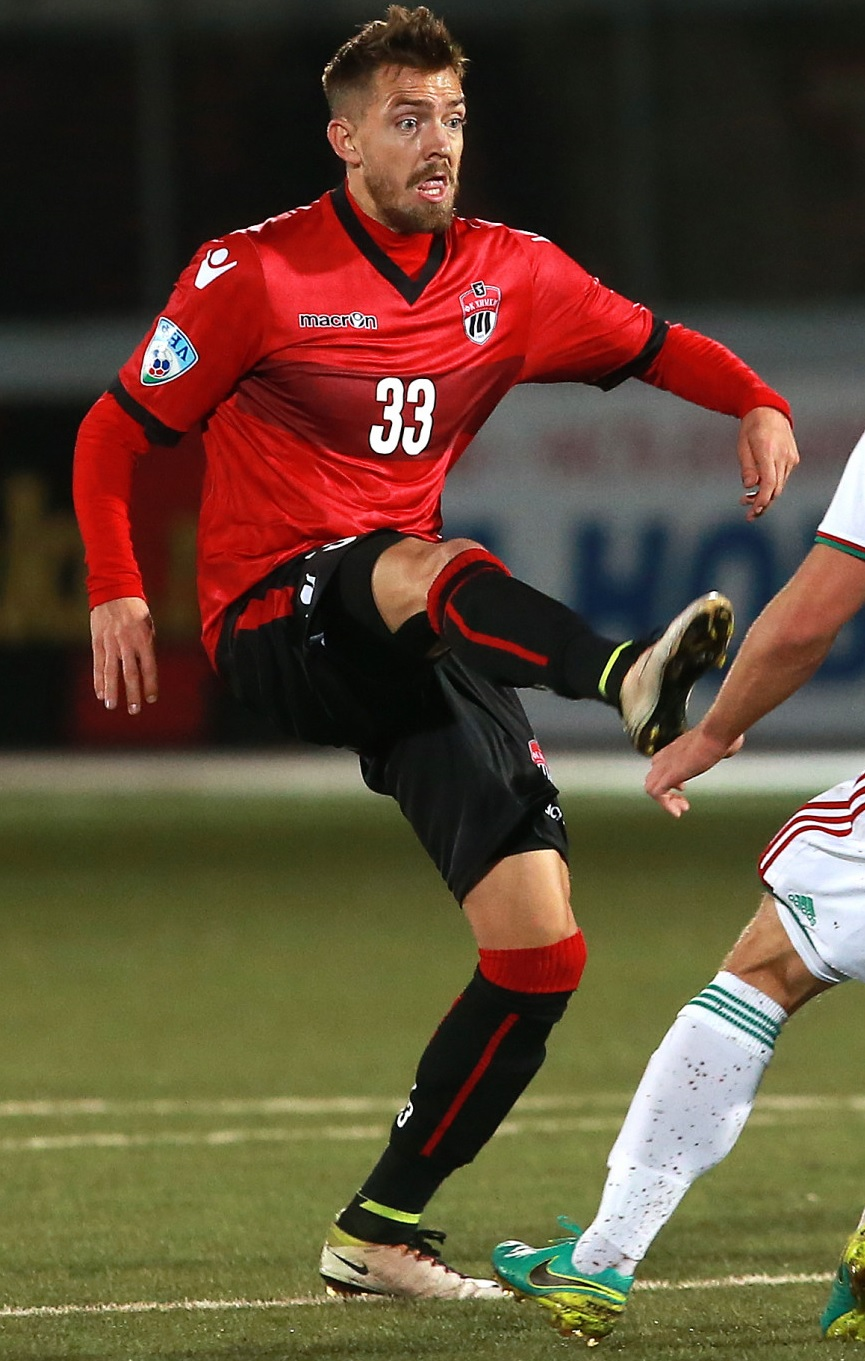
- Sikorski with FC Khimki in 2016

Personal information
- Full name: Daniel Sikorski
- Date of birth: 2 November 1987 (age 38)
- Place of birth: Warsaw, Poland
- Height: 1.83 m (6 ft 0 in)
- Position: Striker

Team information
- Current team: Aris Limassol (sporting director)

Youth career
- SV Waidhofen
- –2005: SKN St. Pölten

Senior career*
Years	Team	Apps	(Gls)
2005–2010	Bayern Munich II	135	(33)
2010–2011	Górnik Zabrze	26	(6)
2011–2012	Polonia Warsaw	15	(0)
2012–2013	Wisła Kraków	19	(1)
2013–2015	St. Gallen	8	(1)
2015–2016	SV Ried	20	(3)
2016	FC Khimki	10	(4)
2017	Gaz Metan Mediaș	15	(4)
2017–2018	Pafos	28	(7)
2018–2019	Nea Salamina	25	(0)
2019–2020	Guijuelo	12	(2)
2020–2023	Aris Limassol	68	(30)

International career
2005–2006	Austria U19	7	(2)
2007	Austria U20	1	(0)
2008	Austria U21	3	(2)
- * Club domestic league appearances and goals

Daniel Sikorski (born 2 November 1987) is an Austrian former professional footballer who played as a striker, who currently serves as the sporting director of Aris Limassol. Besides Austria, he has played in Germany, Switzerland, Russia, Romania, Cyprus, and Spain.

== Club career ==
Sikorski was born in Warsaw, Poland. After spending his youth career at SV Waidhofen and SKN St. Pölten in Austria, he joined the reserve team of Bayern Munich in 2005. In August 2007, Sikorski trained with the Bayern Munich first-team squad. On 12 March 2010, Sikorski announced that he would leave Bayern Munich at the end of the 2009–10 season.

On 23 June 2010, he signed a two-year contract with Polish Ekstraklasa club Górnik Zabrze. After a successful season in Zabrze, on 8 June 2011 he was signed by his hometown club Polonia Warsaw, where he received a four-year contract. After one season, Sikorski moved to Wisła Kraków.

== International career ==
Sikorski played for Austria U-19, U-20 and U-21 national teams. He represented the country at the 2006 UEFA European Under-19 Football Championship.

== Personal life ==
Sikorski was born in Poland, but shortly afterwards he moved with his parents to Waidhofen an der Thaya, Austria. His father Witold was also a professional footballer, who spent playing eight years for Legia Warsaw and for numerous other clubs in Poland, Sweden and Austria. Sikorski holds both Austrian and Polish citizenship.

== Career statistics ==
As of match played on 15 May 2021.

Appearances and goals by club, season and competition
Club	Season	League			Cup		Total	
Club	Season	Division	Apps	Goals	Apps	Goals	Apps	Goals
Bayern Munich II	2005–06	Regionalliga Süd	11	1	—		11	1
Bayern Munich II	2006–07	Regionalliga Süd	28	3	—		28	3
Bayern Munich II	2007–08	Regionalliga Süd	28	12	—		28	12
Bayern Munich II	2008–09	3. Liga	35	10	—		35	10
Bayern Munich II	2009–10	3. Liga	33	7	—		33	7
Bayern Munich II	Total		135	33	—		135	33
Górnik Zabrze	2010–11	Ekstraklasa	26	6	1	0	27	6
Polonia Warsaw	2011–12	Ekstraklasa	15	0	0	0	15	0
Wisła Kraków	2012–13	Ekstraklasa	19	1	4	0	23	1
St. Gallen	2014–15	Swiss Super League	8	1	2	2	10	3
Ried	2015–16	Austrian Bundesliga	20	3	2	4	22	7
Khimki	2016–17	National League	10	4	1	0	11	4
Gaz Metan Mediaș	2016–17	Liga I	15	4	0	0	15	4
Pafos	2017–18	Cypriot First Division	28	7	5	1	33	8
Nea Salamis Famagusta	2018–19	Cypriot First Division	25	0	2	0	27	0
Guijuelo	2019–20	Segunda División B	12	2	1	0	13	2
Aris Limassol	2020–21	Cypriot Second Division	33	24	0	0	33	24
Career total			346	85	18	7	364	92

== Honours ==
Aris Limassol

- Cypriot First Division: 2022–23
