= Manuel Duhnke =

German footballer

Personal information
- Date of birth: 10 August 1987 (age 39)
- Place of birth: Würzburg, West Germany
- Height: 1.77 m (5 ft 10 in)
- Position: Central midfielder

Youth career
- FV Karlstadt
- –2002: FC Schweinfurt 05
- 2002–2005: 1860 Munich

Senior career*
Years	Team	Apps	(Gls)
2005–2008	1860 Munich II	56	(13)
2007–2008	1860 Munich	1	(0)
2008–2010	Bayern Munich II	33	(2)
2011–2012	USK Anif	26	(3)
2012–2015	Würzburger Kickers	67	(13)
2015–2018	SV Heimstetten	94	(13)
2019–2020	SV Heimstetten	13	(2)
Total		290	(36)
- * Club domestic league appearances and goals

Manuel Duhnke (born 10 August 1987) is a German former professional footballer who played as a midfielder.

== Career ==
Duhnke began his career with TSV 1860 Munich, and made one 2. Bundesliga appearance for the club, as a substitute for Daniel Bierofka in a 5–0 win over Erzgebirge Aue in December 2007. He made 56 appearances for 1860's reserve team, often as captain, and scored for the first-team in a friendly match against Bayern Munich in January 2008 which ended 1–1. Six months later, Duhnke joined Bayern, to play for reserve team in the 3. Liga. He made his debut for the club on the opening day of the 2008–09 season, as a substitute for Thomas Müller in a 2–1 win over 1. FC Union Berlin. He made 33 appearances for Bayern II over the next two seasons, leaving after the team were relegated at the end of the 2009–10 season. He spent half a season without a club, signing for Austrian side USK Anif in January 2011. Eighteen months later he returned to Germany to sign for Würzburger Kickers of the Regionalliga Bayern.

== Personal life ==
Duhnke's younger brother Marius is also a footballer.
