= 2012–13 VfB Stuttgart season =

VfB Stuttgart
2012–13 season
- Sporting Director: Fredi Bobic
- Manager: Bruno Labbadia
- Stadium: Mercedes-Benz Arena
- Bundesliga: 12th
- DFB-Pokal: Runners-up
- Europa League: Round of 16
- Top goalscorer: League: Vedad Ibišević (15); All: Vedad Ibišević (24)
- Highest home attendance: 60,000
- Lowest home attendance: 15,000
- Average home league attendance: TBD
Home colours	Away colours	3rd colours

The 2012–13 VfB Stuttgart season was the 120th season in the club's football history. In 2012–13, the club contested the Bundesliga, the top tier of German football. It was Stuttgart's 36th consecutive season in the league, since having been promoted from the 2. Bundesliga in 1977.

== Review and events ==
The club finished in sixth place in the 2011–12 season. Therefore, the club participates in the 2012–13 edition of the UEFA Europa League, and also participates in the 2012–13 edition of the DFB-Pokal.

== Match results ==
=== Legend ===
Win Draw Loss Postponed

=== Bundesliga ===
==== League fixtures and results ====
25 August 2012 1	VfB Stuttgart	0–1	VfL Wolfsburg	Stuttgart
20:45 CEST (UTC+02:00)	Tasci (yellow card) 40'	Report (in German)	Dost 90'	Stadium: Mercedes-Benz Arena; Attendance: 48,280; Referee: Tobias Welz (Wiesbaden)

2 September 2012 2	Bayern Munich	6–1	VfB Stuttgart	Munich
17:30 CEST (UTC+02:00)	Müller 32', 49'; Kroos 33'; Luiz Gustavo 43'; Mandžukić 47'; Schweinsteiger 51'; Boateng (yellow card) 74'	Report (in German)	Gentner (yellow card) 20'; Harnik 25'; Ibišević (red card) 74'	Stadium: Allianz Arena; Attendance: 71,000; Referee: Thorsten Kinhöfer (Herne)

15 September 2012 3	VfB Stuttgart	0–0	Fortuna Düsseldorf	Stuttgart
15:30 CEST (UTC+02:00)		Report (in German)		Stadium: Mercedes-Benz Arena; Attendance: 55,039; Referee: Robert Hartmann (Wangen)

23 September 2012 4	Werder Bremen	2–2	VfB Stuttgart	Bremen
17:30 CEST (UTC+02:00)	De Bruyne 23'; Hunt (yellow card) 31'; Junuzović 34', (yellow card) 40'; Bargfrede (yellow card) 84'; Papastathopoulos (yellow card) 86'; Lukimya (red card) 90+1'	Report (in German)	Harnik (yellow card) 24' (yellow-red card) 88', (goal) 50'; Cacau 81'	Stadium: Weserstadion; Attendance: 40,172; Referee: Guido Winkmann (Kerken)

26 September 2012 5	VfB Stuttgart	0–3	1899 Hoffenheim	Stuttgart
20:00 CEST (UTC+02:00)	Kvist (yellow card) 51'; Cacau (yellow card) 75'	Report (in German)	Usami 5'; Williams (yellow card) 42'; Joselu 47', (yellow card) 78'; Johnson 58'	Stadium: Mercedes-Benz Arena; Attendance: 41,720; Referee: Peter Sippel (Munich)

29 September 2012 6	1. FC Nürnberg	0–2	VfB Stuttgart	Nuremberg
15:30 CEST (UTC+02:00)		Report (in German)	Ibišević 1'; Molinaro (yellow card) 28'; Harnik 75'; Sakai (yellow card) 86'	Stadium: Stadion Nürnberg; Attendance: 43,018; Referee: Florian Meyer (Burgdorf)

7 October 2012 7	VfB Stuttgart	2–2	Bayer Leverkusen	Stuttgart
17:30 CEST (UTC+02:00)	Ibišević 19' (pen.), 55'; Niedermeier (yellow card) 34'; Sakai (yellow card) 35'	Report (in German)	Kießling 13', 59'; Rolfes (yellow card) 18'; Wollscheid (yellow card) 58'; Toprak (yellow card) 89'	Stadium: Mercedes-Benz Arena; Attendance: 47,400; Referee: Günter Perl (Pullach)

21 October 2012 8	Hamburger SV	0–1	VfB Stuttgart	Hamburg
17:30 CEST (UTC+02:00)		Report (in German)	Ibišević 30', (yellow card) 84'; Holzhauser (yellow card) 58'	Stadium: Imtech Arena; Attendance: 53,121; Referee: Tobias Welz (Wiesbaden)

28 October 2012 9	VfB Stuttgart	2–1	Eintracht Frankfurt	Stuttgart
15:30 CEST (UTC+02:00)	Gentner 6', (yellow card) 59'; Molinaro (yellow card) 26'; Ibišević 84'	Report (in German)	Meier (yellow card) 27', (goal) 67'; Zambrano (yellow card) 51'; Rode (yellow card) 62'	Stadium: Mercedes-Benz Arena; Attendance: 47,400; Referee: Peter Gagelmann (Bremen)

3 November 2012 10	Borussia Dortmund	0–0	VfB Stuttgart	Dortmund
17:30 CET (UTC+01:00)		Report (in German)	Holzhauser (yellow card) 18'; Kvist (yellow card) 21'; Ibišević (yellow card) 71'; Gentner (yellow card) 90+3'	Stadium: Signal Iduna Park; Attendance: 80,645; Referee: Felix Zwayer (Berlin)

11 November 2012 11	VfB Stuttgart	2–4	Hannover 96	Stuttgart
17:30 CET (UTC+01:00)	Gentner 21'; Ibišević 37' (pen.); Kuzmanović (yellow card) 42'; Boka (yellow card) 73'	Report (in German)	Huszti (yellow card) 33'; Schmiedebach (yellow card) 47'; Sobiech 57'; Dioud (yellow card) 62'; Schlaudraff 62' (pen.); Abdellaoue 68', 73' (pen.)	Stadium: Mercedes-Benz Arena; Attendance: 50,600; Referee: Felix Brych (Munich)

17 November 2012 12	Borussia Mönchengladbach	1–2	VfB Stuttgart	Mönchengladbach
15:30 CET (UTC+01:00)	Stranzl 7'; Marx (yellow card) 81'; De Camargo (yellow card) 82'; Domínguez (yellow card) 90+3'	Report (in German)	Harnik 8'; Tasci (yellow card) 44'; Traoré (yellow card) 66'; Kuzmanović (yellow card) 67'; Brouwers 72' (o.g.); Okazaki (yellow card) 77'	Stadium: Stadion im Borussia-Park; Attendance: 52,120; Referee: Michael Weiner (Giesen)

25 November 2012 13	SC Freiburg	3–0	VfB Stuttgart	Freiburg
15:30 CET (UTC+01:00)	Rosenthal 22'; Krmaš 67'; Kruse 73'; Guédé (yellow card) 90'; Mujdža (yellow card) 90+1'	Report (in German)	Okazaki (yellow card) 27'; Rodríguez (yellow card) 71'; Molinaro (yellow card) 89'	Stadium: Mage Solar Stadion; Attendance: 24,000; Referee: Tobias Welz (Wiesbaden)

28 November 2012 14	VfB Stuttgart	2–1	FC Augsburg	Stuttgart
20:00 CET (UTC+01:00)	Traoré 11'; Niedermeier (yellow card) 59'; Ibišević 69'	Report (in German)	Sankoh (yellow card) 31'; Koo 44'	Stadium: Mercedes-Benz Arena; Attendance: 38,940; Referee: Bastian Dankert (Rostock)

1 December 2012 15	Greuther Fürth	0–1	VfB Stuttgart	Fürth
15:30 CET (UTC+01:00)	Nöthe (yellow card) 53'; Peković (yellow card) 54'; Kleine (yellow card) 69'; Schmidtgal (yellow card) 69'; Zillner (yellow card) 88'	Report (in German)	Okazaki 45'; Sakai (yellow card) 51'; Tasci (red card) 53'; Ibišević (yellow card) 54'; Kuzmanović (yellow card) 64'; Ulreich (yellow card) 86'	Stadium: Trolli Arena; Attendance: 17,443; Referee: Thorsten Kinhöfer (Herne)

8 December 2012 16	VfB Stuttgart	3–1	Schalke 04	Gelsenkirchen
15:30 CET (UTC+01:00)	Ibišević 2', 38' (pen.), 61', (yellow card) 26'; Boka (yellow card) 59'; Traoré (yellow card) 66'; Sakai (red card) 67'; Harnik (yellow card) 90'	Report (in German)	Marica 12'; Matip (yellow card) 43'; Jones (red card) 73'	Stadium: Veltins-Arena; Attendance: 61,673; Referee: Felix Zwayer (Berlin)

15 December 2012 17	Mainz 05	3–1	VfB Stuttgart	Mainz
15:30 CET (UTC+01:00)	N. Müller (yellow card) 45+1', (goal) 55', 71'; Zabavník (yellow card) 47'; Kirchhoff (yellow card) 80'; Soto 90+2'	Report (in German)	Harnik 48', (yellow card) 74'; Ibišević (yellow card) 57'	Stadium: Coface Arena; Attendance: 31,376; Referee: Felix Brych (Munich)

19 January 2013 18	VfL Wolfsburg	2–0	VfB Stuttgart	Wolfsburg
15:30 CET (UTC+01:00)	Diego 51'; Madlung 67'	Report (in German)	Niedermeier (yellow card) 54'; Rüdiger (yellow card) 66'	Stadium: Volkswagen Arena; Attendance: 24,125; Referee: Felix Brych (Munich)

27 January 2013 19	VfB Stuttgart	0–2	Bayern Munich	Stuttgart
17:30 CET (UTC+01:00)	Harnik (yellow card) 32' (yellow-red card) 80'; Rüdiger (yellow card) 61'	Report (in German)	Mandžukić 50'; Kroos (yellow card) 59'; Müller 72'	Stadium: Mercedes-Benz Arena; Attendance: 55,880; Referee: Felix Zwayer (Berlin)

2 February 2013 20	Fortuna Düsseldorf	3–1	VfB Stuttgart	Düsseldorf
15:30 CET (UTC+01:00)	Kruse 10', 37', (yellow card) 55'; Malezas (yellow card) 12'; Fink 76'	Report (in German)	Sakai (yellow card) 39'; Gentner 60'; Kvist (yellow card) 66'; Lopes (yellow card) 80'	Stadium: Esprit Arena; Attendance: 44,153; Referee: Wolfgang Stark (Ergolding)

9 February 2013 21	VfB Stuttgart	1–4	Werder Bremen	Stuttgart
15:30 CET (UTC+01:00)	Traoré (yellow card) 26', (goal) 50'; Gentner (yellow card) 73'; Ibišević (yellow card) 84'	Report (in German)	Ekici 34', 74'; Petersen (yellow card) 45+1'; Hunt 60'; De Bruyne 90+1'	Stadium: Mercedes-Benz Arena; Attendance: 41,200; Referee: Günter Perl (Pullach)

17 February 2013 22	1899 Hoffenheim	0–1	VfB Stuttgart	Hoffenheim
17:30 CET (UTC+01:00)	Williams (yellow card) 44'; Joselu (yellow card) 73'	Report (in German)	Harnik 3', (yellow card) 83'; Boka (yellow card) 19'; Traoré (yellow card) 63'; Okazaki (yellow card) 90+1'; Rüdiger (yellow card) 90+3'; Ibišević (yellow card) 90+4'	Stadium: Rhein-Neckar Arena; Attendance: 28,750; Referee: Guido Winkmann (Kerken)

23 February 2013 23	VfB Stuttgart	1–1	1. FC Nürnberg	Stuttgart
15:30 CET (UTC+01:00)	Traoré 51'; Harnik (yellow card) 59'	Report (in German)	Kanazaki (yellow card) 15'; Chandler (yellow card) 58'; Polter (yellow card) 63'; Feulner 77'	Stadium: Mercedes-Benz Arena; Attendance: 46,570; Referee: Tobias Stieler (Obertshausen)

2 March 2013 24	Bayer Leverkusen	2–1	VfB Stuttgart	Leverkusen
17:30 CET (UTC+01:00)	Wollscheid (yellow card) 11'; Castro (yellow card) 20'; Reinartz (yellow card) 28'; Kießling 82' (pen.); Bender 86'	Report (in German)	Ibišević 12' (pen.), (yellow card) 88'; Molinaro (yellow card) 89'	Stadium: BayArena; Attendance: 27,058; Referee: Wolfgang Stark (Ergolding)

10 March 2013 25	VfB Stuttgart	0–1	Hamburger SV	Stuttgart
17:30 CET (UTC+01:00)	Niedermeier (yellow card) 64'; Ibišević (yellow card) 85'	(in German)	Rudņevs 50', (yellow card) 72'	Stadium: Mercedes-Benz Arena; Attendance: 47,100; Referee: Christian Dingert (Thallichtenberg)

17 March 2013 26	Eintracht Frankfurt	1–2	VfB Stuttgart	Frankfurt
15:30 CET (UTC+01:00)	Aigner 17'; Meier (yellow card) 88'	(in German)	Molinaro (yellow card) 38'; Ibišević 49' (pen.); Kvist (yellow card) 50'; Niedermeier 71'	Stadium: Commerzbank-Arena; Attendance: 50,600; Referee: Peter Sippel (Munich)

30 March 2013 27	VfB Stuttgart	1–2	Borussia Dortmund	Stuttgart
15:30 CEST (UTC+02:00)	Harnik (yellow card) 23'; Niedermeier (yellow card) 33' (yellow-red card) 70'; Maxim 63'; Boka (yellow card) 81'	(in German)	Piszczek 29'; Götze (yellow card) 70'; Lewandowski 82'; Großkreutz (yellow card) 84'	Stadium: Mercedes-Benz Arena; Attendance: 60,000; Referee: Deniz Aytekin (Oberasbach)

7 April 2013 28	Hannover 96	0–0	VfB Stuttgart	Hannover
17:30 CEST (UTC+02:00)		(in German)		Stadium: AWD Arena; Attendance: 46,000; Referee: Christian Dingert (Thallichtenberg)

14 April 2013 29	VfB Stuttgart	2–0	Borussia Mönchengladbach	Stuttgart
15:30 CEST (UTC+02:00)	Domínguez 28' (o.g.); Gentner 34'	(in German)		Stadium: Mercedes-Benz Arena; Attendance: 53,430; Referee: Wolfgang Stark (Ergolding)

21 April 2013 30	VfB Stuttgart	2–1	SC Freiburg	Stuttgart
15:30 CEST (UTC+02:00)	Gentner 33'; Ibišević 42'	(in German)	Schuster (yellow card) 27'; Ginter (yellow card) 67'; Höhn (yellow card) 69'; Santini 88'	Stadium: Mercedes-Benz Arena; Attendance: 50,600; Referee: Thorsten Kinhöfer (Herne)

27 April 2013 31	FC Augsburg	3–0	VfB Stuttgart	Augsburg
15:30 CEST (UTC+02:00)	Ostrzolek (yellow card) 33'; Verhaegh (yellow card) 36'; Ji (yellow card) 38', (goal) 85'; Mölders 61'; De Jong 83', (yellow card) 84'	(in German)	Rüdiger (yellow card) 17'; Maxim (yellow card) 41'; Ibišević (yellow card) 56'; Niedermeier (yellow card) 73'	Stadium: SGL arena Attendance: 30,660; Referee: Manuel Gräfe (Berlin)

4 May 2013 32	VfB Stuttgart	0–2	Greuther Fürth	Stuttgart
15:30 CEST (UTC+02:00)	Rüdiger (red card) 74'; Sakai (yellow card) 80'	(in German)	Sakai 51' (o.g.); Petsos (yellow card) 53'; Fürstner (yellow card) 63'; Azemi 89'	Stadium: Mercedes-Benz Arena; Attendance: 48,300; Referee: Guido Winkmann (Kerken)

11 May 2013 33	Schalke 04	1–2	VfB Stuttgart	Gelsenkirchen
15:30 CEST (UTC+02:00)	Ulreich 90' (o.g.)	kicker.de (in German)	Maxim (yellow card) 20'; Ibišević 24', 66'; Tasci (yellow card) 34'	Stadium: Veltins-Arena; Attendance: 61,673; Referee: Deniz Aytekin (Oberasbach)

18 May 2013 34	VfB Stuttgart	2–2	Mainz 05	Stuttgart
15:30 CEST (UTC+02:00)	Ulreich (yellow card) 11'; Wetklo 22' (o.g.); Boka 33'; Gentner (yellow card) 37'	(in German)	Ede 16'; Müller 42'	Stadium: Mercedes-Benz Arena; Attendance: 51,020; Referee: Michael Weiner (Giesen)

==== Table ====
===== League table =====
Pos	Team	Pld	W	D	L	GF	GA	GD	Pts	Qualification or relegation
10	1. FC Nürnberg	34	11	11	12	39	47	−8	44	
11	VfL Wolfsburg	34	10	13	11	47	52	−5	43	
12	VfB Stuttgart	34	12	7	15	37	55	−18	43	Qualification for the Europa League third qualifying round (Note: VfB Stuttgart qualified for the Europa League by playing Champions League-qualified Bayern Munich in the 2012–13 DFB-Pokal final. Since they lost, they entered the third qualifying round, and the fifth- and sixth-placed team of the 2012–13 Bundesliga entered the group stage and play-off round respectively.)
13	Mainz 05	34	10	12	12	42	44	−2	42	
14	Werder Bremen	34	8	10	16	50	66	−16	34	

Source: Bundesliga.de, kicker.de
Rules for classification: 1) points; 2) goal difference; 3) number of goals scored.

===== Summary table =====
Overall								Home						Away					
Pld	W	D	L	GF	GA	GD	Pts	W	D	L	GF	GA	GD	W	D	L	GF	GA	GD
34	12	7	15	37	55	−18	43	5	4	8	20	28	−8	7	3	7	17	27	−10

Last updated: 10 July 2013.

=== DFB-Pokal ===
18 August 2012 1st round	SV Falkensee-Finkenkrug	0–5	VfB Stuttgart	Potsdam-Babelsberg
15:30 CEST (UTC+02:00)	Nofz (yellow card) 44'	Report (in German)	Ibišević 29'; Harnik 43', 54'; Torun 79'; Okazaki 87'	Stadium: Karl-Liebknecht-Stadion; Attendance: 7,250; Referee: Thorsten Schriever (Dorum)

31 October 2012 2nd round	VfB Stuttgart	3–0	FC St. Pauli	Stuttgart
19:00 CET (UTC+01:00)	Ibišević (yellow card) 18', (goal) 22'; Traoré 21'; Hajnal 41'	Report (in German)	Kalla (yellow card) 53'	Stadium: Mercedes-Benz Arena; Attendance: 26,100; Referee: Peter Sippel (Munich)

19 December 2012 Round of 16	VfB Stuttgart	2–1	1. FC Köln	Stuttgart
20:30 CET (UTC+01:00)	Gentner 31'; Ibišević 35' (pen.)	Report (in German)	Clemens 80'	Stadium: Mercedes-Benz Arena; Attendance: 27,500; Referee: Deniz Aytekin (Oberasbach)

27 February 2013 Quarter-final	VfB Stuttgart	2–0	VfL Bochum	Stuttgart
19:00 CET (UTC+01:00)	Gentner 18'; Rüdiger (yellow card) 67'; Ibišević 81'	Report (in German)	Scheidhauer (yellow card) 37'; Maltritz (yellow card) 64'	Stadium: Mercedes-Benz Arena; Attendance: 20,200; Referee: Felix Zwayer (Berlin)

17 April 2013 Semi-final	VfB Stuttgart	2–1	SC Freiburg	Stuttgart
20:30	Boka 9'; Harnik 29'	Report (in German)	Rosenthal 14'	Stadium: Mercedes-Benz Arena; Attendance: 60,000; Referee: Florian Meyer (Burgdorf)

1 June 2013 Final	Bayern Munich	3–2	VfB Stuttgart	Berlin
20:00	Müller 37' (pen.); Gómez 48', 61'	Report (in German)	Harnik 71', 80'	Stadium: Olympic Stadium; Attendance: 75,420; Referee: Manuel Gräfe (Berlin)

=== UEFA Europa League ===
==== Play-off round ====
22 August 2012 1st leg	VfB Stuttgart (Germany)	2–0	(Russia) Dynamo Moscow	Stuttgart
18:15 CEST (UTC+02:00)	Ibišević 71', 90+1'	Report (in German)	Wilkshire (yellow card) 5'; Yusupov (yellow card) 46'	Stadium: Mercedes-Benz Arena; Attendance: 20,400; Referee: William Collum (Glasgow, Scotland)

28 August 2012 2nd leg	Dynamo Moscow (Russia)	1–1 (1–3 agg.)	(Germany) VfB Stuttgart	Khimki
18:00 CEST (UTC+02:00)	Chicherin (yellow card) 8'; Kokorin 77'; Granat (yellow card) 87'	Report (in German)	Ibišević 64'	Stadium: Arena Khimki; Attendance: 7,164; Referee: Fırat Aydınus (Turkey)

==== Group stage ====
===== Group E fixtures and results =====
20 September 2012 Match 1	VfB Stuttgart (Germany)	2–2	(Romania) Steaua București	Stuttgart
19:00 CEST (UTC+02:00)	Ibišević 5'; Kvist (yellow card) 29'; Ulreich (yellow card) 80'; Niedermeier 85'	Report (in German)	Chipciu 6'; Rusescu 80' (pen.)	Stadium: Mercedes-Benz Arena; Attendance: 17,155; Referee: Serge Gumienny (Sint-Truiden, Belgium)

4 October 2012 Match 2	Molde (Norway)	2–0	(Germany) VfB Stuttgart	Molde
21:05 CEST (UTC+02:00)	Berget 58'; Forren (yellow card) 71'; Chima 88'	Report (in German)	Niedermeier (yellow card) 65'; Harnik (yellow card) 77'	Stadium: Aker Stadion; Attendance: 5,940; Referee: Kristo Tohver (Estonia)

20 September 2012 Match 3	VfB Stuttgart (Germany)	0–0	(Denmark) Copenhagen	Stuttgart
19:00 CEST (UTC+02:00)	Torun (yellow card) 48'	Report (in German)	Delaney (yellow card) 16'; Bolaños (yellow card) 82'	Stadium: Mercedes-Benz Arena; Attendance: 15,300; Referee: Artur Soares Dias (Portugal)

8 November 2012 Match 4	Copenhagen (Denmark)	0–2	(Germany) VfB Stuttgart	Copenhagen
19:00 CET (UTC+01:00)	Cornelius (yellow card) 29'	Report (in German)	Niedermeier (yellow card) 29'; Molinaro (yellow card) 32'; Ibišević 76'; Harnik 90+2'	Stadium: Parken Stadium; Attendance: 24,681; Referee: Craig Thomson (Scotland)

22 November 2012 Match 5	Steaua București (Romania)	1–5	(Germany) VfB Stuttgart	Bucharest
21:05 CET (UTC+01:00)	Bourceanu (yellow card) 45+2'; Prepeliță (yellow card) 68'; Chipciu (yellow card) 78'; Costea 83'	Report (in German)	Tasci 5'; Harnik 18'; Sakai 23'; Okazaki 31', 55'; Kuzmanović (yellow card) 37'; Kvist (yellow card) 60'; Ibišević (yellow card) 90+1'	Stadium: Arena Națională; Attendance: 55,000; Referee: Michael Koukoulakis (Greece)

6 December 2012 Match 6	VfB Stuttgart (Germany)	0–1	(Norway) Molde	Stuttgart
19:00 CET (UTC+01:00)		Report (in German)	Angan 45+1'; Forren (yellow card) 64'	Stadium: Mercedes-Benz Arena; Attendance: 15,550; Referee: Kevin Blom (Netherlands)

===== Group E table =====
====== Final Group E table ======
Team	Pld	W	D	L	GF	GA	GD	Pts
(Romania) Steaua București	6	3	2	1	9	9	0	11
(Germany) Stuttgart	6	2	2	2	9	6	+3	8
(Denmark) Copenhagen	6	2	2	2	5	6	−1	8
(Norway) Molde	6	2	0	4	6	8	−2	6

====== Group E summary table ======
Overall								Home						Away					
Pld	W	D	L	GF	GA	GD	Pts	W	D	L	GF	GA	GD	W	D	L	GF	GA	GD
6	2	2	2	9	6	+3	8	0	2	1	2	3	−1	2	0	1	7	3	+4

Last updated: 28 November 2012.
Source: kicker.de

==== Knockout phase ====
===== Round of 32 =====
14 February 2013 1st leg	VfB Stuttgart (Germany)	1–1	(Belgium) Genk	Stuttgart, Germany
21:05	Gentner 42'; Boka (yellow card) 50'; Niedermeier (yellow card) 56'; Ibišević (yellow card) 87'	Report (in German)	Plet 90+1'	Stadium: Mercedes-Benz Arena; Attendance: 15,200; Referee: Manuel de Sousa (Portugal)

21 February 2013 2nd leg	Genk (Belgium)	0–2 (1–3 agg.)	(Germany) VfB Stuttgart	Genk, Belgium
19:00 CET (UTC+01:00)	Hyland (yellow card) 65'	Report (in German)	Boka 45'; Ibišević (yellow card) 46'; Gentner 58'; Maxim (yellow card) 78'	Stadium: Cristal Arena; Attendance: 16,796; Referee: Alon Yefet (Israel)

===== Round of 16 =====
7 March 2013 1st leg	VfB Stuttgart (Germany)	0–2	(Italy) Lazio	Stuttgart, Germany
19:00 CET (UTC+01:00)	Tasci (yellow card) 49'; Harnik (yellow card) 87'	Report	Ederson 21'; Hernanes (yellow card) 38'; Ciani (yellow card) 45'; Onazi 56'; Cana (yellow card) 87'	Stadium: Mercedes-Benz Arena; Attendance: 28,750; Referee: Alexandru Tudor (Romania)

14 March 2013 2nd leg	Lazio (Italy)	3–1 (5–1 agg.)	(Germany) VfB Stuttgart	Rome, Italy
21:05 CET (UTC+01:00)	Kozák 6', 8', 87'; Biava (yellow card) 82'	Report	Ibišević (yellow card) 10'; Hajnal (yellow card) 16', (goal) 62'	Stadium: Stadio Olimpico; Attendance: 0^{[Note]} Referee: Tom Harald Hagen (Norway)

Notes

- Note: The Lazio v Stuttgart match was played behind closed doors due to the punishment handed to Lazio by UEFA following incidents at their round of 32 match second leg against Borussia Mönchengladbach on 21 February 2013.

=== Overall record ===
As of 22 April 2013

Competition	First match	Last match	Record							
Competition	First match	Last match	G	W	D	L	GF	GA	GD	Win %
Bundesliga	25 August 2012	18 May 2013	34	12	7	15	37	55	−18	35.29
DFB-Pokal	18 August 2012	1 June 2013	6	5	0	1	16	5	+11	83.33
Europa League	22 August 2012	14 March 2013	12	4	4	4	16	13	+3	33.33
Total			47	20	10	17	63	62	+1	42.55

== Squad ==
=== Appearances and goals ===
No.	Pos	Nat	Player	Total		Bundesliga		DFB-Pokal		Europa League	
No.	Pos	Nat	Player	Apps	Goals	Apps	Goals	Apps	Goals	Apps	Goals
Goalkeepers
1	GK	(Germany) GER	Sven Ulreich	48	0	34	0	4	0	10	0
22	GK	(Germany) GER	Marc Ziegler	0	0	0	0	0	0	0	0
33	GK	(Germany) GER	André Weis	0	0	0	0	0	0	0	0
Defenders
2	DF	(Japan) JPN	Gōtoku Sakai	37	1	27	0	2	0	8	1
3	DF	(Brazil) BRA	Felipe Lopes	3	0	3	0	0	0	0	0
5	DF	(Germany) GER	Serdar Tasci (Captain)	36	1	25	0	3	0	8	1
6	DF	(Germany) GER	Georg Niedermeier	37	2	27	1	4	0	6	1
12	DF	(Germany) GER	Benedikt Röcker	2	0	2	0	0	0	0	0
15	DF	(Ivory Coast) CIV	Arthur Boka	35	3	25	1	3	1	7	1
21	DF	(Italy) ITA	Cristian Molinaro	33	0	25	0	2	0	6	0
23	DF	(Germany) GER	Tim Hoogland (L)	6	0	4	0	1	0	1	0
24	DF	(Germany) GER	Antonio Rüdiger	21	0	16	0	2	0	3	0
14	DF	(Mexico) MEX	Francisco Javier Rodríguez	21	0	14	0	2	0	5	0
Midfielders
4	MF	(Denmark) DEN	William Kvist	34	0	23	0	3	0	8	0
10	MF	(Germany) GER	Daniel Didavi	4	0	3	0	1	0	0	0
13	MF	(Guinea) GUI	Mamadou Bah	1	0	1	0	0	0	0	0
16	MF	(Guinea) GUI	Ibrahima Traoré	45	4	32	3	4	1	9	0
19	MF	(Austria) AUT	Kevin Stöger	1	0	0	0	1	0	0	0
20	MF	(Germany) GER	Christian Gentner	48	9	34	5	4	2	10	2
26	MF	(Austria) AUT	Raphael Holzhauser	27	0	21	0	1	0	5	0
30	MF	(Hungary) HUN	Tamás Hajnal	22	1	13	0	2	1	7	0
44	MF	(Romania) ROU	Alexandru Maxim	13	1	11	1	0	0	2	0
8	MF	(Serbia) SRB	Zdravko Kuzmanović	17	0	12	0	2	0	3	0
Strikers
7	FW	(Austria) AUT	Martin Harnik	43	13	30	6	3	5	10	2
9	FW	(Bosnia and Herzegovina) BIH	Vedad Ibišević	44	24	30	15	4	4	10	5
14	FW	(Italy) ITA	Federico Macheda	16	0	14	0	1	0	1	0
17	FW	(Turkey) TUR	Tunay Torun	16	1	9	0	1	1	6	0
18	FW	(Germany) GER	Cacau	10	1	5	1	1	0	4	0
29	FW	(Germany) GER	Soufian Benyamina	2	0	2	0	0	0	0	0
31	FW	(Japan) JPN	Shinji Okazaki	38	4	25	1	4	1	9	2

Last updated: 4 March 2013.
Source: kicker.de

=== Transfers ===
==== In ====
#	Position	Player	Transferred from	Fee	Date	Contract expires	Team	Reference
17	MF	(Turkey) Tunay Torun	(Germany) Hertha BSC	Free transfer	6 June 2012	30 June 2015	First-team	
44	MF	(Romania) Alexandru Maxim	(Romania) Pandurii Târgu Jiu	€1.5M	31 January 2013	30 June 2017	First-team	

==== Out ====
#	Position	Player	Transferred to	Fee	Date	Reference
17	DF	(France) Matthieu Delpierre	(Germany) 1899 Hoffenheim	Free transfer	18 April 2012	
10	MF	(Germany) Timo Gebhart	(Germany) 1. FC Nürnberg	€1M	3 May 2012	
27	DF	(Germany) Stefano Celozzi	(Germany) Eintracht Frankfurt	Free transfer	7 May 2012	
21	DF	(Netherlands) Khalid Boulahrouz	(Portugal) Sporting CP	Free transfer	18 July 2012	
23	FW	(Germany) Julian Schieber	(Germany) Borussia Dortmund	€5.5M	21 July 2012	
	DF	(Mexico) Francisco Javier Rodríguez	(Mexico) América	€2M	1 January 2013	
	MF	(Serbia) Zdravko Kuzmanović	(Italy) Internazionale	€1.2M	31 January 2013	

==== Loan in ====
#	Position	Player	Loaned from	Date	Loan expires	Team	Reference
3	DF	(Brazil) Felipe Lopes	(Germany) VfL Wolfsburg	22 January 2013	30 June 2013	First-team	
14	FW	(Italy) Federico Macheda	(England) Manchester United	24 January 2013	30 June 2013	First-team	
23	DF	(Germany) Tim Hoogland	(Germany) Schalke 04	28 June 2012	30 June 2013	First-team	

== Kits ==
Home	Away	Third	Third Alternate

== VfB Stuttgart II ==
The 2012–13 VfB Stuttgart II season pertains to the reserve team for VfB Stuttgart. The season began on 21 July 2012 and ended on 18 May 2013. They are participating in the 3. Liga.
