= 2012–13 DFB-Pokal =

Tournament details
- Country: Germany
- Teams: 64

Final positions
- Champions: Bayern Munich
- Runners-up: VfB Stuttgart

Tournament statistics
- Matches played: 63
- Goals scored: 202 (3.21 per match)
- Top goal scorer(s): Mario Gómez (6 goals)

The 2012–13 DFB-Pokal was the 70th season of the annual German football cup competition. It began on 17 August 2012 with the first of six rounds and ended on 1 June 2013 with the final at the Olympiastadion in Berlin. The defending champions were Borussia Dortmund, but they were beaten by Bayern Munich in the quarter-finals. Bayern Munich went on to win the competition, defeating VfB Stuttgart 3–2 in the final, ultimately going on to conquer the continental treble. As runners-up, VfB Stuttgart have qualified for the third qualifying round of the 2013–14 UEFA Europa League, since Bayern Munich won the Bundesliga and thus gained the right to compete in the 2013–14 UEFA Champions League.

== Participating clubs ==
The following 64 teams competed in the first round:

Bundesliga the 18 clubs of the 2011–12 season	2. Bundesliga; the 18 clubs of the 2011–12 season	3. Liga; the top 4 clubs of the 2011–12 season
FC Augsburg; SV Werder Bremen; Borussia Dortmund; SC Freiburg; Hamburger SV; Hannover 96; Hertha BSC; TSG 1899 Hoffenheim; 1. FC Kaiserslautern; 1. FC Köln; Bayer 04 Leverkusen; 1. FSV Mainz 05; Borussia Mönchengladbach; FC Bayern Munich; 1. FC Nürnberg; FC Schalke 04; VfB Stuttgart; VfL Wolfsburg	Alemannia Aachen; FC Erzgebirge Aue; 1. FC Union Berlin; VfL Bochum; Eintracht Braunschweig; FC Energie Cottbus; Dynamo Dresden (Note: Dynamo Dresden were originally banned from the competition as the consequence of incidents involving their supporters during and after their second-round match of the 2011–12 competition. This verdict was later changed to a home match behind closed doors, an away match without allowing entrance to the Dresden fans, and a fine of €100,000.); MSV Duisburg; Fortuna Düsseldorf; Eintracht Frankfurt; FSV Frankfurt; SpVgg Greuther Fürth; FC Ingolstadt 04; Karlsruher SC; TSV 1860 Munich; SC Paderborn 07; FC Hansa Rostock; FC St. Pauli	VfR Aalen; 1. FC Heidenheim 1846; SSV Jahn Regensburg; SV Sandhausen
Winners of 21 regional cup competitions
Baden FC Nöttingen; Bavaria (Note: The three regions with the most participating teams in their league competitions (Bavaria, Lower Saxony, Westphalia) are allowed to enter two teams for the competition.) SpVgg Unterhaching (CW) SV Wacker Burghausen (Note: Bavarian Cup runners-up SC Eltersdorf had to compete in a play-off against Wacker Burghausen, the winners of the match between the losing semi-finalists, for the second Bavarian spot; this play-off was won by Wacker Burghausen.); Berlin Berliner AK 07; Brandenburg SV Falkensee-Finkenkrug; Bremen FC Oberneuland; Hamburg SC Victoria Hamburg; Hesse Kickers Offenbach	Lower Rhine Rot-Weiss Essen; Lower Saxony TSV Havelse (CW) SV Wilhelmshaven; Mecklenburg-Vorpommern FC Schönberg 95; Middle Rhine FC Hennef 05; Rhineland SV Roßbach/Wied; Saarland; 1. FC Saarbrücken; Saxony Chemnitzer FC	Saxony-Anhalt Hallescher FC; Schleswig-Holstein VfB Lübeck; South Baden Offenburger FV; Southwest Wormatia Worms; Thuringia FC Carl Zeiss Jena; Westphalia Arminia Bielefeld (CW) SC Preußen Münster; Württemberg SG Sonnenhof Großaspach (Note: Since 1. FC Heidenheim 1846 will enter the competition via their league placement, runners-up SG Sonnenhof Großaspach will inherit the spot reserved for the cup winners.)

== Schedule ==
The rounds of the 2012–13 competition are scheduled as follows:

Round	Draw date	Matches
First round		17–20 August 2012
Second round		30–31 October 2012
Round of 16		18–19 December 2012
Quarter-finals		26–27 February 2013
Semi-finals		16–17 April 2013
Final		1 June 2013 at Olympiastadion, Berlin

== Draw ==
The draws for the different rounds are conducted as following: For the first round, the participating teams will be split into two pots. The first pot contains all teams which have qualified through their regional cup competitions, the best four teams of the 3rd Liga and the bottom four teams of the Second Bundesliga. Every team from this pot will be drawn to a team from the second pot, which contains all remaining professional teams. The teams from the first pot will be set as the home team in the process.

The two-pot scenario will also be applied for the second round, with the remaining 3rd Liga/amateur teams in the first pot and the remaining professional teams in the other pot. Once one pot is empty, the remaining pairings will be drawn from the other pot with the first-drawn team for a match serving as hosts. For the remaining rounds, the draw will be conducted from just one pot. Any remaining 3rd Liga/amateur team will be the home team if drawn against a professional team. In every other case, the first-drawn team will serve as hosts.

== Matches ==
=== First round ===
The draw took place on 23 June 2012.

17 August 2012	SG Sonnenhof Großaspach	1–2	FSV Frankfurt	Aspach
19:00	Szimayer 16'	Report	Stark 21'; Leckie 22'	Stadium: comtech Arena; Attendance: 1,436; Referee: Benjamin Brand (Gerolzhofen)

17 August 2012	VfB Lübeck	0–3	Eintracht Braunschweig	Lübeck
19:00		Report	Kratz 13', 68'; Boland 67'	Stadium: PokerStars.de – Stadion an der Lohmühle; Attendance: 6,411; Referee: Deniz Aytekin (Oberasbach)

17 August 2012	SV Wilhelmshaven	0–2	FC Augsburg	Wilhelmshaven
19:00		Report	Bancé 28'; Musona 78'	Stadium: Jadestadion; Attendance: 4,098; Referee: Christian Bandurski (Oberhausen)

18 August 2012	Hallescher FC	0–1	MSV Duisburg	Halle
15:30		Report	Šukalo 17' (pen.)	Stadium: Erdgas Sportpark; Attendance: 7,000; Referee: Robert Hartmann (Wangen)

18 August 2012	FC Oberneuland	0–3	Borussia Dortmund	Bremen
15:30		Report	Reus 10'; Błaszczykowski 38'; Perišić 67'	Stadium: Weserstadion; Attendance: 19,325; Referee: Florian Meyer (Burgdorf)

18 August 2012	SpVgg Unterhaching	1–2	1. FC Köln	Unterhaching
15:30	Voglsammer 90'	Report	Bröker 28', 40'	Stadium: Sportpark Unterhaching; Attendance: 6,000; Referee: Frank Willenborg (Osnabrück)

18 August 2012	SV Falkensee-Finkenkrug	0–5	VfB Stuttgart	Potsdam
15:30		Report	Ibišević 30'; Harnik 43', 54'; Torun 79'; Okazaki 87'	Stadium: Karl-Liebknecht-Stadion; Attendance: 7,250; Referee: Thorsten Schriever (Dorum)

18 August 2012	Victoria Hamburg	1–2	SC Freiburg	Hamburg
15:30	Sachs 12'	Report	Kruse 11'; Freis 79'	Stadium: Stadion Hoheluft; Attendance: 4,375; Referee: Christian Dietz (Kronach)

18 August 2012	Offenburger FV	0–3	FC St. Pauli	Offenburg
15:30		Report	Saglik 23', 68'; Ginczek 77'	Stadium: Karl-Heitz-Stadion; Attendance: 10,000; Referee: Christian Leicher (Landshut)

18 August 2012	Alemannia Aachen	0–2	Borussia Mönchengladbach	Aachen
15:30		Report	Arango 70'; Nordtveit 90+1'	Stadium: New Tivoli; Attendance: 31,736; Referee: Felix Zwayer (Berlin)

18 August 2012	FC Carl Zeiss Jena	0–4	Bayer Leverkusen	Jena
15:30		Report	Rolfes 3'; Bellarabi 15'; Kießling 81'; Fernándes 90'	Stadium: Ernst-Abbe-Sportfeld; Attendance: 10,000; Referee: Tobias Stieler (Hamburg)

18 August 2012	Berliner AK 07	4–0	1899 Hoffenheim	Berlin
15:30	Cakmak 3', 49'; Gerlach 31'; Kruschke 40'	Report		Stadium: Poststadion; Attendance: 1,468; Referee: Sascha Stegemann (Niederkassel)

18 August 2012	1. FC Heidenheim 1846	0–2	VfL Bochum	Heidenheim an der Brenz
18:00		Report	Dedić 5', 41'	Stadium: Voith-Arena; Attendance: 7,500; Referee: Tobias Christ (Münchweiler an der Rodalb)

18 August 2012	FC Schönberg 95	0–5	VfL Wolfsburg	Lübeck
20:30		Report	Olić 28', 30', 67'; Diego 43'; Dost 66'	Stadium: PokerStars.de – Stadion an der Lohmühle; Attendance: 3,500; Referee: Robert Kampka (Mainz)

18 August 2012	Kickers Offenbach	2–0	Greuther Fürth	Offenbach am Main
20:30	Rathgeber 28'; Bender 90+1'	Report		Stadium: Sparda Bank Hessen Stadium; Attendance: 7,620; Referee: Christian Dingert (Lebecksmühle)

19 August 2012	FC Nöttingen	1–6	Hannover 96	Reutlingen
14:30	Neziraj 53'	Report	Pinto 27', 32'; Andreasen 47'; Schlaudraff 55', 83'; Rausch 79'	Stadium: Stadion an der Kreuzeiche; Attendance: 3,168; Referee: Benjamin Cortus (Röthenbach)

19 August 2012	Wormatia Worms	2–1	Hertha BSC	Worms
14:30	Bauer 3' (pen.); Dressler 82'	Report	Wagner 64'	Stadium: Wormatia-Stadion; Attendance: 6,263; Referee: Norbert Grudzinski (Hamburg)

19 August 2012	Karlsruher SC	4–2	Hamburger SV	Karlsruhe
14:30	van der Biezen 31'; Alibaz 58'; Stoll 78'; Soriano 86'	Report	Berg 23'; Beister 45+1'	Stadium: Wildparkstadion; Attendance: 18,000; Referee: Bastian Dankert (Rostock)

19 August 2012	FC Hennef 05	0–6	1860 Munich	Bonn
14:30		Report	Vallori 31'; Lauth 34'; Blanco 69'; Bülow 70'; Bierofka 72' (pen.); Stoppelkamp 90'	Stadium: Sportpark Nord; Attendance: 6,000; Referee: Manuel Kunzmann (Bad Hersfeld)

19 August 2012	TSV Havelse	3–2 (a.e.t.)	1. FC Nürnberg	Garbsen
14:30	Beismann 13'; Posipal 60'; Vucinovic 97'	Report	Esswein 7'; Mak 80'	Stadium: Wilhelm-Langrehr-Stadion; Attendance: 3,506; Referee: Robert Kempter (Sauldorf)

19 August 2012	VfR Aalen	3–0	FC Ingolstadt	Aalen
16:00	Lechleiter 15'; Dausch 35'; Valentini 90+3'	Report		Stadium: Scholz-Arena; Attendance: 2,800; Referee: Marcel Unger (Halle)

19 August 2012	Arminia Bielefeld	3–1	SC Paderborn	Bielefeld
16:00	Schütz 55'; Schönfeld 86'; Hübener 90'	Report	Meha 36'	Stadium: Bielefelder Alm; Attendance: 20,000; Referee: Markus Wingenbach (Mainz)

19 August 2012	1. FC Saarbrücken	0–5	Schalke 04	Saarbrücken
16:00		Report	Papadopoulos 23'; Draxler 27', 57'; Marica 65', 72'	Stadium: Ludwigsparkstadion; Attendance: 30,000; Referee: Tobias Welz (Wiesbaden)

19 August 2012	Erzgebirge Aue	3–0	Eintracht Frankfurt	Aue
16:00	Paulus 21' (pen.); Sylvestr 61', 90'	Report		Stadium: Sparkassen-Erzgebirgsstadion; Attendance: 9,575; Referee: Daniel Siebert (Berlin)

19 August 2012	Preußen Münster	4–2 (a.e.t.)	Werder Bremen	Münster
16:00	Taylor 54', 81', 118'; Nazarov 96'	Report	Elia 45'; Füllkrug 67'	Stadium: Preußenstadion; Attendance: 18,000; Referee: Peter Sippel (Munich)

19 August 2012	Hansa Rostock	1–3	1. FC Kaiserslautern	Rostock
18:30	Plat 77'	Report	Bunjaku 49'; Zuck 56'; Fortounis 90+3'	Stadium: DKB-Arena; Attendance: 10,000; Referee: Florian Steuer (Menden)

19 August 2012	Wacker Burghausen	0–1	Fortuna Düsseldorf	Burghausen
18:30		Report	Reisinger 76'	Stadium: Wacker-Arena; Attendance: 4,000; Referee: Harm Osmers (Hanover)

19 August 2012	SV Roßbach/Wied	0–4	Mainz 05	Koblenz
20:30		Report	Szalai 5', 43'; Baumgartlinger 47'; Choupo-Moting 62'	Stadium: Stadion Oberwerth; Attendance: 3,100; Referee: Bibiana Steinhaus (Hannover)

20 August 2012	SV Sandhausen	3–0	Energie Cottbus	Sandhausen
18:30	Löning 3'; Schulz 10'; Fießer 90'	Report		Stadium: Hardtwaldstadion; Attendance: 5,000; Referee: Thorsten Kinhöfer (Herne)

20 August 2012	Rot-Weiss Essen	0–1 (a.e.t.)	Union Berlin	Essen
18:30		Report	Terodde 120'	Stadium: Stadion Essen; Attendance: 10,000; Referee: Martin Petersen (Stuttgart)

20 August 2012	Chemnitzer FC	0–3	Dynamo Dresden	Chemnitz
18:30		Report	Koch 32'; Poté 42'; Buchner 84' (o.g.)	Stadium: Stadion an der Gellertstraße; Attendance: 14,500; Referee: Markus Schmidt (Stuttgart)

20 August 2012	Jahn Regensburg	0–4	Bayern Munich	Regensburg
20:30		Report	Mandžukić 32', 80'; Shaqiri 60'; Pizarro 88'	Stadium: Jahnstadion; Attendance: 12,500; Referee: Guido Winkmann (Kerken)

=== Second round ===
The draw took place on 25 August 2012.

30 October 2012	Berliner AK 07	0–3	1860 Munich	Berlin
19:00		Report	Stoppelkamp 38', 62'; Blanco 89'	Stadium: Friedrich-Ludwig-Jahn-Sportpark; Attendance: 2,500; Referee: Bibiana Steinhaus (Hannover)

30 October 2012	Wormatia Worms	0–0 (a.e.t.) (3–4 p)	1. FC Köln	Worms
19:00		Report		Stadium: Wormatia-Stadion; Attendance: 7,203; Referee: Robert Hartmann (Wangen)
	Penalties
	Rösner (penalty scored); Bauer (penalty scored); Wittke (penalty missed); Steil (penalty scored); Abele (penalty missed)		(penalty scored) Chihi; (penalty scored) Lehmann; (penalty scored) Matuszczyk; (penalty missed) Bigalke; (penalty scored) Brečko

30 October 2012	Preußen Münster	0–1	FC Augsburg	Münster
19:00		Report	Callsen-Bracker 69'	Stadium: Preußenstadion; Attendance: 16,200; Referee: Marco Fritz (Korb)

30 October 2012	Eintracht Braunschweig	0–2	SC Freiburg	Braunschweig
19:00		Report	Caligiuri 1'; Flum 84'	Stadium: Eintracht-Stadion; Attendance: 20,167; Referee: Felix Brych (Munich)

30 October 2012	TSV Havelse	1–3	VfL Bochum	Garbsen
20:30	Posipal 17'	Report	Iashvili 30'; Rzatkowski 73'; Ortega 90+4'	Stadium: Wilhelm-Langrehr-Stadion; Attendance: 3,350; Referee: Christian Bandurski (Oberhausen)

30 October 2012	Schalke 04	3–0	SV Sandhausen	Gelsenkirchen
20:30	Afellay 11'; Marica 62'; Huntelaar 79'	Report		Stadium: Veltins-Arena; Attendance: 52,970; Referee: Michael Weiner (Ottenstein)

30 October 2012	VfR Aalen	1–4	Borussia Dortmund	Aalen
20:30	Klauß 87'	Report	Hummels 22'; Schmelzer 32'; Götze 50'; Schieber 79'	Stadium: Scholz-Arena; Attendance: 13,251; Referee: Günter Perl (Pullach)

30 October 2012	Mainz 05	2–0	Erzgebirge Aue	Mainz
20:30	Ivanschitz 18'; Mallı 47'	Report		Stadium: Coface Arena; Attendance: 12,000; Referee: Bastian Dankert (Rostock)

31 October 2012	Karlsruher SC	1–0	MSV Duisburg	Karlsruhe
19:00	Kempe 88'	Report		Stadium: Wildparkstadion; Attendance: 14,921; Referee: Tobias Stieler (Hamburg)

31 October 2012	Arminia Bielefeld	2–3 (a.e.t.)	Bayer Leverkusen	Bielefeld
19:00	Hille 11'; Schütz 82'	Report	Hegeler 23'; Friedrich 56'; Schürrle 94'	Stadium: Bielefelder Alm; Attendance: 24,771; Referee: Jochen Drees (Münster-Sarmsheim)

31 October 2012	Kickers Offenbach	2–0	Union Berlin	Offenbach am Main
19:00	Fetsch 74'; Vogler 85'	Report		Stadium: Sparda Bank Hessen Stadium; Attendance: 12,247; Referee: Peter Gagelmann (Bremen)

31 October 2012	VfB Stuttgart	3–0	FC St. Pauli	Stuttgart
19:00	Traoré 21'; Ibišević 22'; Hajnal 41'	Report		Stadium: Mercedes-Benz Arena; Attendance: 26,100; Referee: Peter Sippel (Munich)

31 October 2012	Hannover 96	1–1 (a.e.t.) (4–3 p)	Dynamo Dresden	Hanover
20:30	Diouf 15'	Report	Brégerie 28'	Stadium: AWD-Arena; Attendance: 35,000; Referee: Wolfgang Stark (Ergolding)
	Penalties
	Stindl (penalty scored); Schmiedebach (penalty scored); Rausch (penalty scored); Sobiech (penalty missed); Schlaudraff (penalty scored)		(penalty missed) Losilla; (penalty scored) Fiél; (penalty scored) Solga; (penalty scored) Jungwirth; (penalty missed) Poté

31 October 2012	Bayern Munich	4–0	1. FC Kaiserslautern	Munich
20:30	Pizarro 11', 58'; Robben 49', 88'	Report		Stadium: Allianz Arena; Attendance: 71,000; Referee: Daniel Siebert (Berlin)

31 October 2012	Fortuna Düsseldorf	1–0 (a.e.t.)	Borussia Mönchengladbach	Düsseldorf
20:30	Rafael 97'	Report		Stadium: Esprit Arena; Attendance: 54,000; Referee: Knut Kircher (Rottenburg)

31 October 2012	VfL Wolfsburg	2–0	FSV Frankfurt	Wolfsburg
20:30	Diego 51'; Dost 61'	Report		Stadium: Volkswagen Arena; Attendance: 7,538; Referee: Manuel Gräfe (Berlin)

=== Round of 16 ===
The draw for this round took place on 4 November 2012, while the matches took place on 18–19 December 2012.

18 December 2012	Karlsruher SC	0–1	SC Freiburg	Karlsruhe
19:00		Report	Schmid 2'	Stadium: Wildparkstadion; Attendance: 28,200; Referee: Jochen Drees (Münster-Sarmsheim)

18 December 2012	Schalke 04	1–2	Mainz 05	Gelsenkirchen
19:00	Huntelaar 75'	Report	Caligiuri 30'; Müller 83'	Stadium: Veltins-Arena; Attendance: 53,000; Referee: Marco Fritz (Korb)

18 December 2012	Kickers Offenbach	2–0	Fortuna Düsseldorf	Offenbach am Main
20:30	Fetsch 76'; Vogler 85'	Report		Stadium: Sparda Bank Hessen Stadium; Attendance: 18,400; Referee: Felix Zwayer (Berlin)

18 December 2012	FC Augsburg	0–2	Bayern Munich	Augsburg
20:30		Report	Gómez 26'; Shaqiri 85'	Stadium: SGL arena Attendance: 30,660; Referee: Thorsten Kinhöfer (Herne)

19 December 2012	VfL Wolfsburg	2–1	Bayer 04 Leverkusen	Wolfsburg
19:00	Träsch 78'; Dost 90'	Report	Fagner 31' (o.g.)	Stadium: Volkswagen Arena; Attendance: 10,781; Referee: Knut Kircher (Rottenburg)

19 December 2012	VfL Bochum	3–0	1860 Munich	Bochum
19:00	Dedić 30'; Maltritz 75', 78'	Report		Stadium: rewirpowerSTADION; Attendance: 20,206; Referee: Tobias Welz (Wiesbaden)

19 December 2012	Borussia Dortmund	5–1	Hannover 96	Dortmund
20:30	Götze 3', 40', 84'; Błaszczykowski 18'; Lewandowski 90'	Report	Diouf 79'	Stadium: Westfalenstadion; Attendance: 77,615; Referee: Felix Brych (Munich)

19 December 2012	VfB Stuttgart	2–1	1. FC Köln	Stuttgart
20:30	Gentner 31'; Ibišević 35' (pen.)	Report	Clemens 80'	Stadium: Mercedes-Benz Arena; Attendance: 27,500; Referee: Deniz Aytekin (Oberasbach)

=== Quarter-finals ===
The draw for this round took place on 19 December 2012. The matches were played on 26–27 February 2013.

All times are UTC+1

26 February 2013	Mainz 05	2–3 (a.e.t.)	SC Freiburg	Mainz
19:00	Parker 2'; Zimling 4'	Report	Santini 86'; Caligiuri 90+3', 108'	Stadium: Coface Arena; Attendance: 22,517; Referee: Deniz Aytekin (Oberasbach)

26 February 2013	Kickers Offenbach	1–2	VfL Wolfsburg	Offenbach am Main
20:30	Stadel 81'	Report	Olić 49'; Dost 71'	Stadium: Sparda Bank Hessen Stadium; Attendance: 20,000; Referee: Wolfgang Stark (Ergolding)

27 February 2013	VfB Stuttgart	2–0	VfL Bochum	Stuttgart
19:00	Gentner 18'; Ibišević 81'	Report		Stadium: Mercedes-Benz Arena; Attendance: 20,200; Referee: Felix Zwayer (Berlin)

27 February 2013	Bayern Munich	1–0	Borussia Dortmund	Munich
20:30	Robben 43'	Report		Stadium: Allianz Arena; Attendance: 71,000; Referee: Knut Kircher (Rottenburg)

=== Semi-finals ===
The draw for this round took place on 3 March 2013. The matches were played on 16–17 April 2013.

16 April 2013
20:30

Bayern Munich	6–1	VfL Wolfsburg
Mandžukić 18'; Robben 35'; Shaqiri 50'; Gómez 80', 83', 86'	Report	Diego 45'

Allianz Arena, Munich
Attendance: 71,000
Referee: Knut Kircher (Rottenburg)

17 April 2013
20:30

VfB Stuttgart	2–1	SC Freiburg
Boka 9'; Harnik 29'	Report	Rosenthal 14'

Mercedes-Benz Arena, Stuttgart
Attendance: 60,000
Referee: Florian Meyer (Burgdorf)

=== Final ===
1 June 2013
20:00 CEST

Bayern Munich	3–2	VfB Stuttgart
Müller 37' (pen.); Gómez 48', 61'	Report	Harnik 71', 80'

Olympiastadion, Berlin
Attendance: 74,420
Referee: Manuel Gräfe (Berlin)

== Bracket ==
First round
Preußen Münster	4
Werder Bremen	2
SV Wilhelmshaven	0
FC Augsburg	2
Jahn Regensburg	0
Bayern Munich	4
Hansa Rostock	1
1. FC Kaiserslautern	3
VfR Aalen	3
FC Ingolstadt	0
FC Oberneuland	0
Borussia Dortmund	3
FC Nöttingen	1
Hannover 96	6
Chemnitzer FC	0
Dynamo Dresden	3
Kickers Offenbach	2
Greuther Fürth	0
Rot-Weiss Essen	0
Union Berlin	1
Wacker Burghausen	0
Fortuna Düsseldorf	1
Alemannia Aachen	0
Borussia Mönchengladbach	2
FC Schönberg 95	0
VfL Wolfsburg	5
SG Sonnenhof Großaspach	1
FSV Frankfurt	2
Arminia Bielefeld	3
SC Paderborn	1
Carl Zeiss Jena	0
Bayer Leverkusen	4
SV Falkensee-Finkenkrug	0
VfB Stuttgart	5
Offenburger FV	0
FC St. Pauli	3
Wormatia Worms	2
Hertha BSC	1
SpVgg Unterhaching	1
1. FC Köln	2
TSV Havelse	3
1. FC Nürnberg	2
1. FC Heidenheim 1846	0
VfL Bochum	2
Berliner AK	4
1899 Hoffenheim	0
Hennef 05	0
1860 Munich	6
1. FC Saarbrücken	0
Schalke 04	5
SV Sandhausen	3
Energie Cottbus	0
SV Roßbach/Wied	0
Mainz 05	4
Erzgebirge Aue	3
Eintracht Frankfurt	0
Karlsruher SC	4
Hamburger SV	2
Hallescher FC	0
MSV Duisburg	1
VfB Lübeck	0
Eintracht Braunschweig	3
Victoria Hamburg	1
SC Freiburg	2

Second round
Preußen Münster	0
FC Augsburg	1
Bayern Munich	4
1. FC Kaiserslautern	0
VfR Aalen	1
Borussia Dortmund	4
Hannover 96	1
Dynamo Dresden	1
Kickers Offenbach	2
Union Berlin	0
Fortuna Düsseldorf	1
Borussia Mönchengladbach	0
VfL Wolfsburg	2
FSV Frankfurt	0
Arminia Bielefeld	2
Bayer Leverkusen	3
VfB Stuttgart	3
FC St. Pauli	0
Wormatia Worms	0
1. FC Köln	0
TSV Havelse	1
VfL Bochum	3
Berliner AK	0
1860 Munich	3
Schalke 04	3
SV Sandhausen	0
Mainz 05	2
Erzgebirge Aue	0
Karlsruher SC	1
MSV Duisburg	0
Eintracht Braunschweig	0
SC Freiburg	2

Round of 16
FC Augsburg	0
Bayern Munich	2
Borussia Dortmund	5
Hannover 96	1
Kickers Offenbach	2
Fortuna Düsseldorf	0
VfL Wolfsburg	2
Bayer Leverkusen	1
VfB Stuttgart	2
1. FC Köln	1
VfL Bochum	3
1860 Munich	0
Schalke 04	1
Mainz 05	2
Karlsruher SC	0
SC Freiburg	1

Quarter-finals
Bayern Munich	1
Borussia Dortmund	0
Kickers Offenbach	1
VfL Wolfsburg	2
VfB Stuttgart	2
VfL Bochum	0
Mainz 05	2
SC Freiburg	3

Semi-finals
Bayern Munich	6
VfL Wolfsburg	1
VfB Stuttgart	2
SC Freiburg	1

Final
Bayern Munich	3
VfB Stuttgart	2

== Top goalscorers ==
The following were the top scorers of the DFB-Pokal, sorted first by number of goals, and then alphabetically if necessary. Goals scored in penalty shoot-outs are not included.

Rank	Player	Team	Goals
1	(Germany) Mario Gómez	Bayern Munich	6
2	(Austria) Martin Harnik	VfB Stuttgart	5
3	(Netherlands) Bas Dost	VfL Wolfsburg	4
3	(Germany) Mario Götze	Borussia Dortmund	4
3	(Bosnia and Herzegovina) Vedad Ibišević	VfB Stuttgart	4
3	(Croatia) Ivica Olić	VfL Wolfsburg	4
3	(Netherlands) Arjen Robben	Bayern Munich	4
8	(Germany) Daniel Caligiuri	SC Freiburg	3
8	(Slovenia) Zlatko Dedić	VfL Bochum	3
8	(Brazil) Diego	VfL Wolfsburg	3
8	(Croatia) Mario Mandzukic	Bayern Munich	3
8	(Romania) Ciprian Marica	Schalke 04	3
8	(Peru) Claudio Pizarro	Bayern Munich	3
8	(Switzerland) Xherdan Shaqiri	Bayern Munich	3
8	(Germany) Moritz Stoppelkamp	TSV 1860 Munich	3
8	(United States) Matthew Taylor	SC Preußen Münster	3
