= Shinji Okazaki =

Japanese footballer (born 1986)

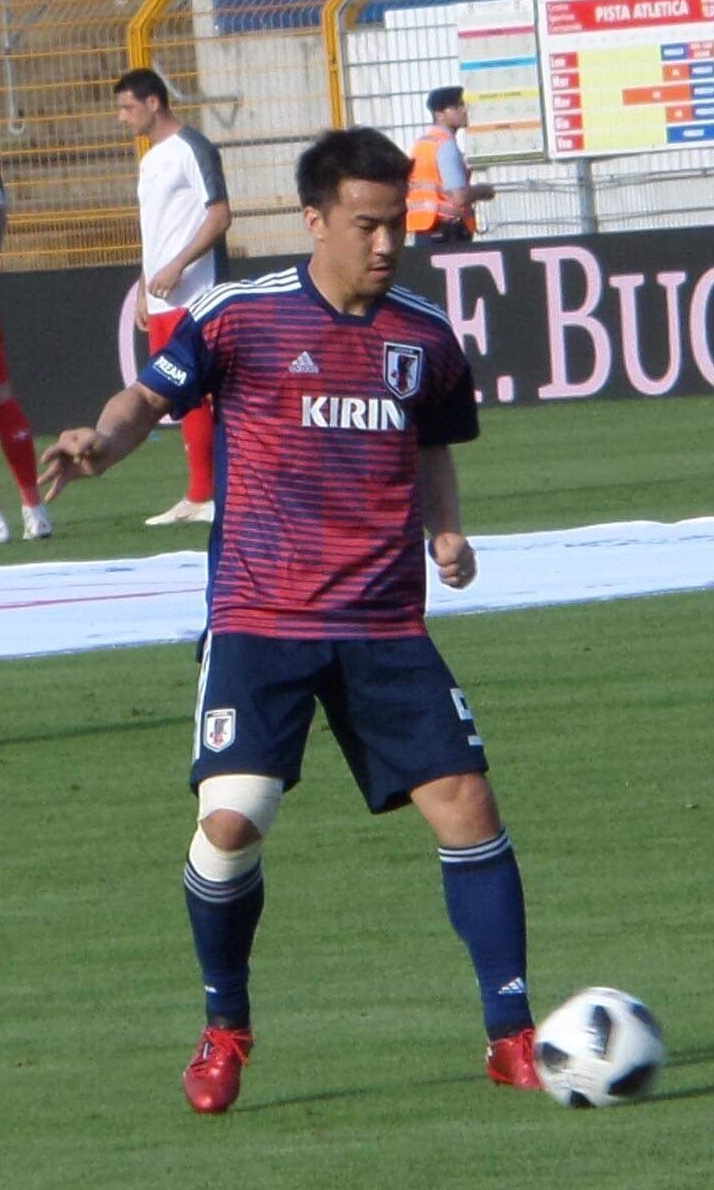
- Okazaki with Japan in 2018

Personal information
- Full name: Shinji Okazaki
- Date of birth: 16 April 1986 (age 40)
- Place of birth: Takarazuka, Hyōgo, Japan
- Height: 1.74 m (5 ft 9 in)
- Position: Forward

Youth career
- Takarazuka Jr FC
- 2002–2004: Takigawa Daini High School

Senior career*
Years	Team	Apps	(Gls)
2005–2010	Shimizu S-Pulse	121	(42)
2011–2013	VfB Stuttgart	63	(10)
2013–2015	Mainz 05	65	(27)
2015–2019	Leicester City	114	(14)
2019	Málaga	0	(0)
2019–2021	Huesca	62	(13)
2021–2022	Cartagena	32	(2)
2022–2024	Sint-Truiden	37	(1)
Total		494	(109)

International career
2007–2008	Japan U23	14	(1)
2008–2019	Japan	119	(50)

Managerial career
- 2024–: FC Basara Mainz
Medal record
Representing Japan
AFC Asian Cup
Winner	2011 Qatar
- * Club domestic league appearances and goals

Shinji Okazaki (岡崎 慎司, Okazaki Shinji; born 16 April 1986) is a Japanese former professional footballer who played as a forward. He is best known for winning the Premier League with Leicester City in 2016. He is currently the manager of FC Basara Mainz.

Internationally, he is Japan's third all-time top goalscorer with 50 goals.

== Club career ==
=== Shimizu S-Pulse ===
After graduating Takigawa Daini High School in 2004, Okazaki signed full professional terms with Shimizu S-Pulse the following year. In December 2005, he made his first J.League appearance as a substitute against Sanfrecce Hiroshima. On 15 April 2007, he scored his first professional goal against Kawasaki Frontale. Okazaki ended his first season as a first team player with three goals from 13 matches.

Okazaki scored ten times in 27 matches during the 2008 J. League season and also represented S-Pulse in the J. League Cup Final, where the team lost 2–0 to Oita Trinita. He continued his promising goalscoring in the 2009 and 2010 seasons and, in January 2011, was signed by German side VfB Stuttgart of the Bundesliga.

=== VfB Stuttgart ===
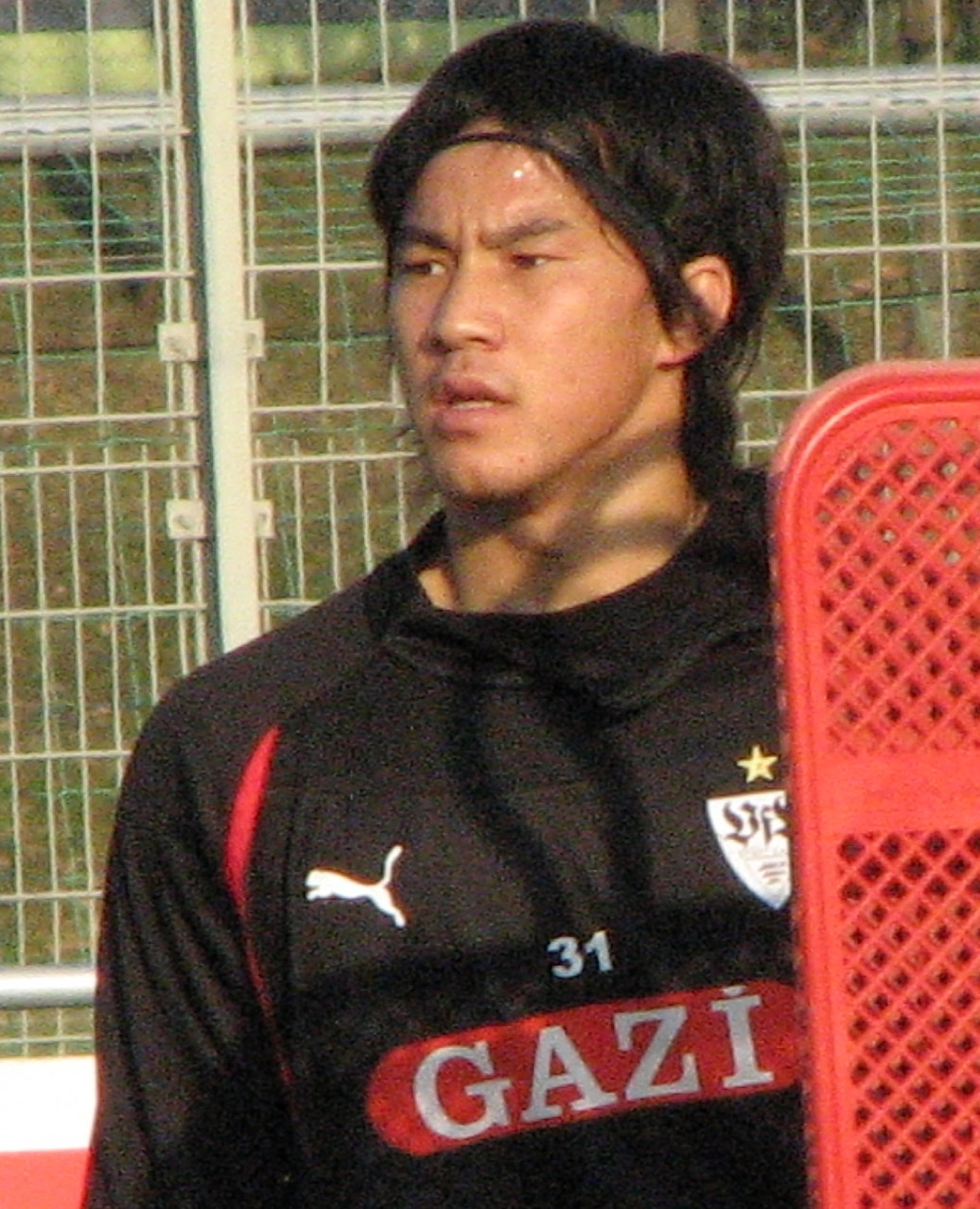
Okazaki with VfB Stuttgart in 2011

On 30 January 2011, Okazaki signed a three-and-a-half-year contract with Stuttgart. On 17 February 2011, clearance to play for the club was granted for Okazaki by FIFA. He made his competitive debut for VfB on the same night in a Europa League match against Benfica. On 20 February 2011, Okazaki made his Bundesliga debut for VfB against Bayer 04 Leverkusen. Okazaki scored his first goal against Hannover 96, which he scored from outside the box.

Okazaki came on as a second-half substitute for Stuttgart in their first game of the 2011–12 Bundesliga season against Schalke 04. His side were up 2–0 and Okazaki added a goal scoring from long range in the 90th minute, sealing a 3–0 win. Okazaki's goal from a bicycle kick on 19 February 2012 in a Bundesliga match of VfB Stuttgart against Hannover 96 was selected Goal of the Month. After Yasuhiko Okudera in April 1978, Okazaki was the second player from Japan to win this award in Germany.

Okazaki had a poor 2012–13 season, scoring only once in the Bundesliga. However, he scored his first goals in European competition with two goals against Steaua București in the Europa League.

=== Mainz 05 ===
On 1 July 2013, Okazaki moved to Mainz 05. He scored his first goal for Mainz on his debut in a 3–2 win against his former club Stuttgart on the opening matchday of the 2013–14 Bundesliga season. At the end of the season he ended with 15 league goals.

Okazaki became the most prolific Japanese player in Bundesliga history on 13 September 2014, scoring his 27th and 28th league goals in Mainz's 3–1 win over Hertha Berlin.

=== Leicester City ===
==== 2015–16 ====
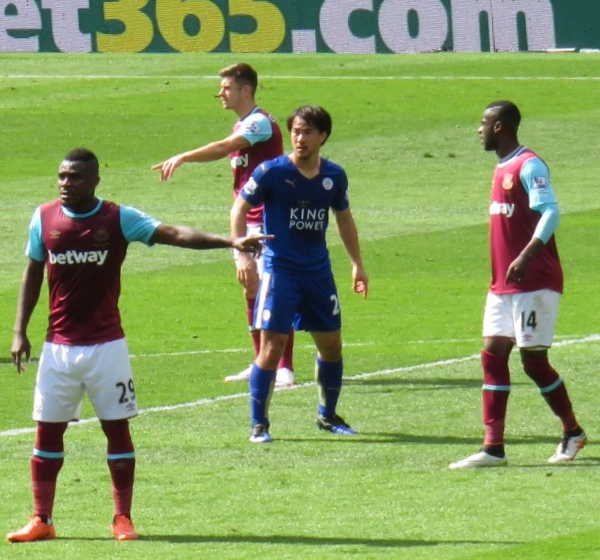
Okazaki (middle) playing for Leicester City in 2016

On 26 June 2015, Okazaki moved to Premier League side Leicester City for a fee believed to be in the region of £7 million.

He made his debut for the club on 8 August 2015 in Leicester City's 4–2 opening day win against Sunderland, and scored his first goal for the club the following week in a 2–1 win against West Ham United. On 19 December 2015, Okazaki scored the winner in a 3–2 win over Everton at Goodison Park, to ensure that Leicester City topped the table at Christmas.

On 10 January 2016, Okazaki scored Leicester's second goal in the FA Cup clash at White Hart Lane with Tottenham Hotspur despite drawing to a Harry Kane penalty in the 90th minute. On 14 March 2016, Okazaki scored in a league fixture against Newcastle United: a spectacular overhead strike that won Leicester City the game 1–0 and took them five points clear at the top of the Premier League table. Leicester City went on to win the league that year, making Okazaki the second Japanese player to win the Premier League after Shinji Kagawa.

His performances in the 2015–16 season earned him the Asian International Player of the Year award in December 2016.

==== 2016–17 ====
Okazaki scored twice in a 2–4 defeat to Chelsea in the third round of the 2016–17 EFL Cup on 20 September 2016. He scored his first league goal of the season in a 3–1 win over Crystal Palace on 22 October 2016, earning him Man of the match and achieving an 84.8% pass success rate, more than any other Leicester player. On 22 November 2016, Okazaki scored in a 2–1 win over Club Brugge in the Champions League group stage, becoming the sixth Japanese player to score a Champions League goal and the first since Keisuke Honda in November 2013. He finished the season with only three league goals.

==== 2017–2019 ====
Okazaki was in goalscoring form at the start to the 2017–18 season, scoring four goals in six appearances for Leicester in all competitions. He was released by Leicester at the end of the 2018–19 season.

=== Málaga ===
On 30 July 2019, Okazaki signed a one-year contract with Málaga CF. However, Málaga canceled its contract with Okazaki after just 34 days, since his wage demands exceeded its maximum budget as permitted by the league.

=== Huesca ===
On 4 September 2019, the free agent Okazaki signed a one-year contract with Segunda División side Huesca. On 8 September 2019, he made his debut for Huesca as a substitute.

On 25 July 2020, after scoring 12 times as his side achieved promotion to La Liga, Okazaki renewed his contract for a further year.

=== Cartagena ===
On 31 August 2021, Okazaki moved to FC Cartagena in the second division on a one-year contract.

=== Sint-Truiden ===
On 19 August 2022, Okazaki signed with Sint-Truiden in Belgium. On 26 February 2024, he announced he would retire from playing at the end of the 2023–24 season.

== International career ==
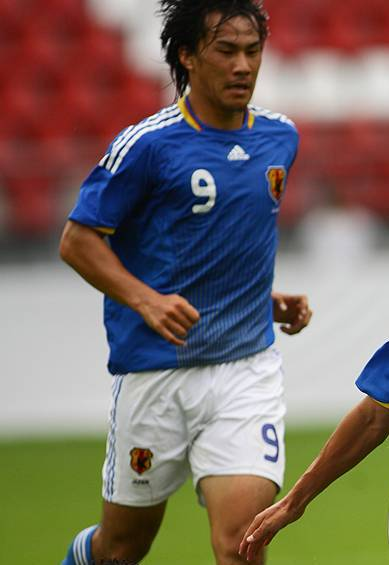
Okazaki with Japan in 2009

After competing for the country's under-23 team at the 2008 Olympic Games in China, Okazaki made his full international debut for the Japan senior national team against the United Arab Emirates in October 2008. On 20 January 2009, he scored his first goal for Samurai Blue in the team's opening 2011 AFC Asian Cup qualifier against Yemen.

In October 2009, Okazaki scored hat-tricks in consecutive matches as Japan beat Hong Kong and Togo 6–0 and 5–0 respectively. He was named The World's Top Goal Scorer of 2009 by the IFFHS for his 15 goals with the national team.

Okazaki was included in the 2010 FIFA World Cup squads for the 2010 FIFA World Cup and appeared as a substitute in all four of Japan's matches. He scored once in the final Group E match, a 3–1 defeat of Denmark, to send Japan into the second round.

On 8 October 2010, Okazaki scored as Japan beat Argentina 1–0 in friendly match to record its first ever win over the 1978 and 1986 world champions.

Okazaki scored his third international hat-trick in a 5–0 Group B win against Saudi Arabia at the 2011 AFC Asian Cup. He then scored his kick in the semi-final shootout win over South Korea and played all 120 minutes of the final as Japan beat Australia to win the trophy for a fourth time.

Okazaki finished as top goalscorer in the Asian section of qualification for the 2014 FIFA World Cup with eight goals.

Okazaki scored twice at the 2013 FIFA Confederations Cup, against Italy and Mexico respectively. However, Japan lost all three of its matches and was eliminated at the end of the group stage.

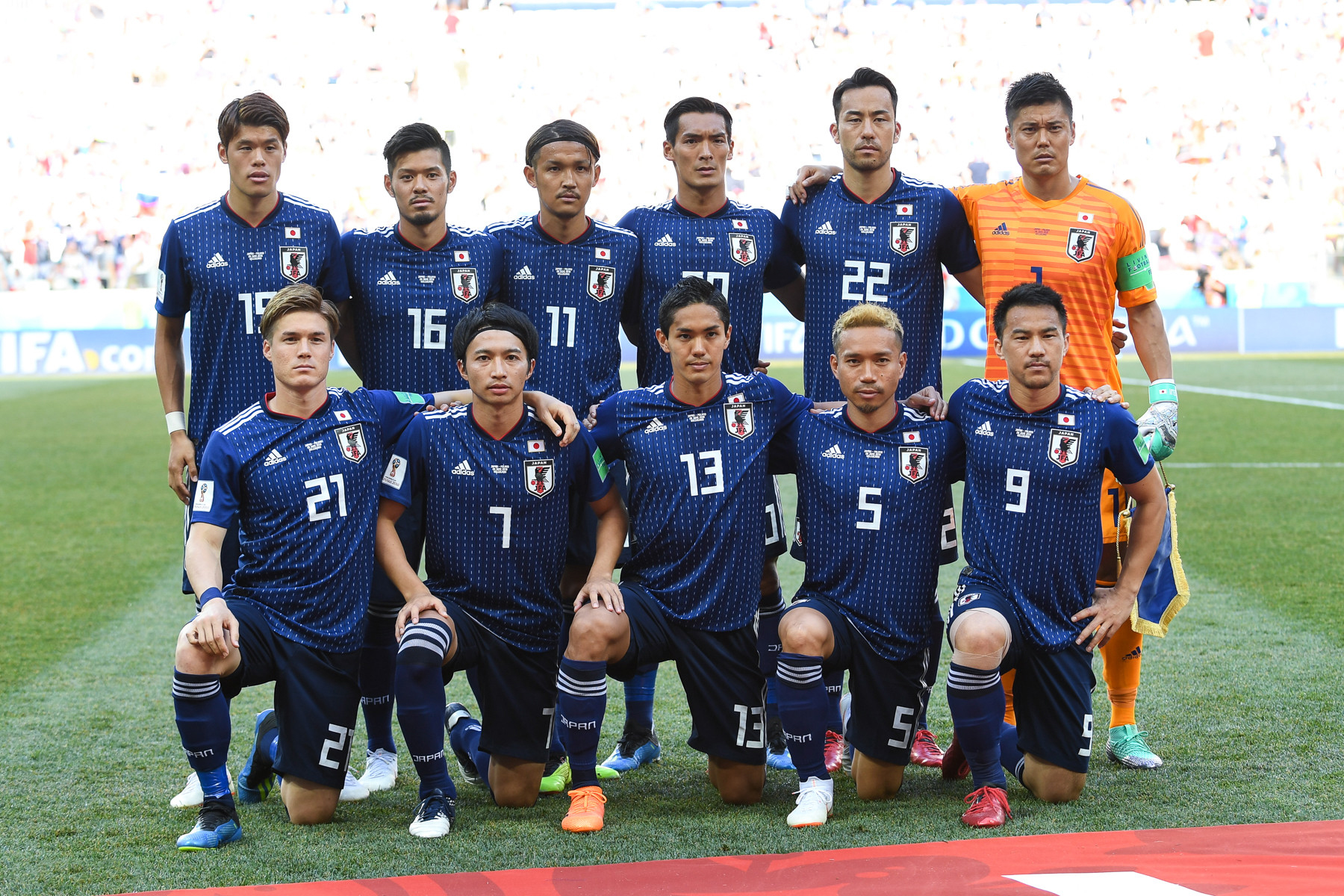
Okazaki (front row, far right) with Japan at the 2018 FIFA World Cup

In June 2014, Okazaki was selected in the Japan's squad for the 2014 FIFA World Cup. In the team's third group match, a 4–1 defeat to Colombia, he scored Samurai Blue's only goal with a header in the 45th minute.

Okazaki was included in Japan's squad for the 2015 AFC Asian Cup and scored in a 4–0 defeat of Palestine during the group stage.

In March 2016, Okazaki was presented with a commemorative shirt with 100 on the back in a presentation to celebrate his 100th international appearance for Japan.

Okazaki last played for the national team in a 1-1 draw against Ecuador at the 2019 Copa América. Okazaki ended his career as Japan's third all-time goalscorer with 50 international goals.

== Managerial career ==
Okazaki co-founded the German football club Basara Mainz in the 2014–15 season when he was a player of Mainz 05. Now he serves as the club adviser. The club is run by the other co-founder, Takashi Yamashita, former player of Mainz's reserve team Mainz 05 II. Basara Mainz started in tier 11 of the German football league system. It was promoted to tier 6, Verbandsliga Südwest, in 2019.

== Career statistics ==
=== Club ===
Appearances and goals by club, season and competition
Club	Season	League			National cup (Note: Includes Emperor's Cup, DFB-Pokal, FA Cup, Community Shield, Copa del Rey and Belgian Cup.)		League cup (Note: Includes J.League Cup and Football League/EFL Cup.)		Continental		Total	
Club	Season	Division	Apps	Goals	Apps	Goals	Apps	Goals	Apps	Goals	Apps	Goals
Shimizu S-Pulse	2005	J.League Division 1	1	0	3	0	1	0	—		5	0
Shimizu S-Pulse	2006	J.League Division 1	7	0	3	0	2	0	—		12	0
Shimizu S-Pulse	2007	J.League Division 1	21	5	2	0	2	0	—		25	5
Shimizu S-Pulse	2008	J.League Division 1	27	10	2	1	5	0	—		34	11
Shimizu S-Pulse	2009	J.League Division 1	34	14	3	2	4	1	—		41	17
Shimizu S-Pulse	2010	J.League Division 1	31	13	4	2	2	1	—		37	16
Shimizu S-Pulse	Total		121	42	17	5	16	2	—		154	49
VfB Stuttgart	2010–11	Bundesliga	12	2	—		—		2 (Note: Appearances in UEFA Europa League)	0	14	2
VfB Stuttgart	2011–12	Bundesliga	26	7	3	0	—		—		29	7
VfB Stuttgart	2012–13	Bundesliga	25	1	6	1	—		11	2	42	4
VfB Stuttgart	Total		63	10	9	1	—		13	2	85	13
Mainz 05	2013–14	Bundesliga	33	15	2	0	—		—		35	15
Mainz 05	2014–15	Bundesliga	32	12	1	1	—		2	1	35	14
Mainz 05	Total		65	27	3	1	—		2	1	70	29
Leicester City	2015–16	Premier League	36	5	2	1	1	0	—		39	6
Leicester City	2016–17	Premier League	30	3	3	0	1	2	7 (Note: Appearances in UEFA Champions League)	1	41	6
Leicester City	2017–18	Premier League	27	6	3	0	2	1	—		32	7
Leicester City	2018–19	Premier League	21	0	1	0	3	0	—		25	0
Leicester City	Total		114	14	9	1	7	3	7	1	137	19
Huesca	2019–20	Segunda División	37	12	1	0	—		—		38	12
Huesca	2020–21	La Liga	25	1	1	0	—		—		26	1
Huesca	Total		63	13	2	0	0	0	0	0	65	13
Cartagena	2021–22	Segunda División	32	2	3	0	—		—		35	2
Cartagena	Total		32	2	3	0	0	0	0	0	35	2
Sint-Truiden	2022–23	Belgian Pro League	30	1	2	0	—		—		32	1
Sint-Truiden	2023–24	Belgian Pro League	7	0	2	1	—		—		9	1
Sint-Truiden	Total		37	1	4	1	0	0	0	0	41	2
Career total			495	109	47	9	23	5	22	4	587	127

=== International ===
Appearances and goals by national team and year
National team	Year	Apps	Goals
Japan	2008	4	0
Japan	2009	16	15
Japan	2010	15	3
Japan	2011	14	8
Japan	2012	9	3
Japan	2013	14	7
Japan	2014	13	4
Japan	2015	13	7
Japan	2016	8	2
Japan	2017	5	1
Japan	2018	5	0
Japan	2019	3	0
Total		119	50

Scores and results list Japan's goal tally first, score column indicates score after each Okazaki goal.

List of international goals scored by Shinji Okazaki
No.	Date	Venue	Opponent	Score	Result	Competition	Ref.
1	20 January 2009	Umakana Yokana Stadium, Kumamoto, Japan	Yemen	1–0	2–1	2011 AFC Asian Cup qualification	
2	4 February 2009	National Olympic Stadium, Tokyo, Japan	Finland	1–0	5–1	Friendly	
3	4 February 2009	National Olympic Stadium, Tokyo, Japan	Finland	2–0	5–1	Friendly	
4	27 May 2009	Nagai Stadium, Osaka, Japan	Chile	1–0	4–0	2009 Kirin Cup	
5	27 May 2009	Nagai Stadium, Osaka, Japan	Chile	2–0	4–0	2009 Kirin Cup	
6	31 May 2009	National Olympic Stadium, Tokyo, Japan	Belgium	3–0	4–0	2009 Kirin Cup	
7	6 June 2009	Pakhtakor Markaziy Stadium, Tashkent, Uzbekistan	Uzbekistan	1–0	1–0	2010 FIFA World Cup qualification	
8	9 September 2009	Stadion Galgenwaard, Utrecht, Netherlands	Ghana	3–3	4–3	Friendly	
9	8 October 2009	IAI Stadium Nihondaira, Shizuoka, Japan	Hong Kong	1–0	6–0	2011 AFC Asian Cup qualification	
10	8 October 2009	IAI Stadium Nihondaira, Shizuoka, Japan	Hong Kong	5–0	6–0	2011 AFC Asian Cup qualification	
11	8 October 2009	IAI Stadium Nihondaira, Shizuoka, Japan	Hong Kong	6–0	6–0	2011 AFC Asian Cup qualification	
12	14 October 2009	Miyagi Stadium, Miyagi, Japan	Togo	1–0	5–0	Friendly	
13	14 October 2009	Miyagi Stadium, Miyagi, Japan	Togo	2–0	5–0	Friendly	
14	14 October 2009	Miyagi Stadium, Miyagi, Japan	Togo	4–0	5–0	Friendly	
15	18 November 2009	Hong Kong Stadium, So Kon Po, Hong Kong	Hong Kong	4–0	4–0	2011 AFC Asian Cup qualification	
16	3 March 2010	Toyota Stadium, Toyota, Japan	Bahrain	2–0	2–0	2011 AFC Asian Cup qualification	
17	24 June 2010	Royal Bafokeng Stadium, Rustenburg, South Africa	Denmark	3–1	3–1	2010 FIFA World Cup	
18	8 October 2010	Saitama Stadium 2002, Saitama, Japan	Argentina	1–0	1–0	Friendly	
19	17 January 2011	Ahmed bin Ali Stadium, Al Rayyan, Qatar	Saudi Arabia	1–0	5–0	2011 AFC Asian Cup	
20	17 January 2011	Ahmed bin Ali Stadium, Al Rayyan, Qatar	Saudi Arabia	2–0	5–0	2011 AFC Asian Cup	
21	17 January 2011	Ahmed bin Ali Stadium, Al Rayyan, Qatar	Saudi Arabia	5–0	5–0	2011 AFC Asian Cup	
22	6 September 2011	Pakhtakor Markaziy Stadium, Tashkent, Uzbekistan	Uzbekistan	1–1	1–1	2014 FIFA World Cup qualification	
23	11 October 2011	Nagai Stadium, Osaka, Japan	Tajikistan	2–0	8–0	2014 FIFA World Cup qualification	
24	11 October 2011	Nagai Stadium, Osaka, Japan	Tajikistan	8–0	8–0	2014 FIFA World Cup qualification	
25	11 November 2011	Pamir Stadium, Dushanbe, Tajikistan	Tajikistan	2–0	4–0	2014 FIFA World Cup qualification	
26	11 November 2011	Pamir Stadium, Dushanbe, Tajikistan	Tajikistan	4–0	4–0	2014 FIFA World Cup qualification	
27	23 May 2012	Shizuoka Stadium, Shizuoka, Japan	Azerbaijan	2–0	2–0	Friendly	
28	3 June 2012	Saitama Stadium 2002, Saitama, Japan	Oman	3–0	3–0	2014 FIFA World Cup qualification	
29	14 November 2012	Sultan Qaboos Sports Complex, Muscat, Oman	Oman	2–1	2–1	2014 FIFA World Cup qualification	
30	6 February 2013	Kobe City Misaki Park Stadium, Kobe, Japan	Latvia	1–0	3–0	Friendly	
31	6 February 2013	Kobe City Misaki Park Stadium, Kobe, Japan	Latvia	3–0	3–0	Friendly	
32	22 March 2013	Khalifa International Stadium, Doha, Qatar	Canada	1–0	2–1	Friendly	
33	11 June 2013	Grand Hamad Stadium, Doha Qatar	Iraq	1–0	1–0	2014 FIFA World Cup qualification	
34	19 June 2013	Itaipava Arena Pernambuco, Recife, Brazil	Italy	3–3	3–4	2013 FIFA Confederations Cup	
35	22 June 2013	Estádio Mineirão, Belo Horizonte, Brazil	Mexico	1–2	1–2	2013 FIFA Confederations Cup	
36	19 November 2013	King Baudouin Stadium, Brussels, Belgium	Belgium	3–1	3–2	Friendly	
37	5 March 2014	National Olympic Stadium, Tokyo, Japan	New Zealand	1–0	4–2	Friendly	
38	5 March 2014	National Olympic Stadium, Tokyo, Japan	New Zealand	4–0	4–2	Friendly	
39	24 June 2014	Arena Pantanal, Cuiabá, Brazil	Colombia	1–1	1–4	2014 FIFA World Cup	
40	18 November 2014	Nagai Stadium, Osaka, Japan	Australia	2–0	2–1	Friendly	
41	12 January 2015	Newcastle Stadium, Newcastle, Australia	Palestine	2–0	4–0	2015 AFC Asian Cup	
42	27 March 2015	Ōita Bank Dome, Ōita, Japan	Tunisia	1–0	2–0	Friendly	
43	31 March 2015	Ajinomoto Stadium, Chōfu, Japan	Uzbekistan	2–0	5–1	Friendly	
44	11 June 2015	Nissan Stadium, Yokohama, Japan	Iraq	3–0	4–0	Friendly	
45	8 September 2015	Azadi Stadium, Tehran, Iran	Afghanistan	4–0	6–0	2018 FIFA World Cup and 2019 AFC Asian Cup qualification	
46	8 September 2015	Azadi Stadium, Tehran, Iran	Afghanistan	5–0	6–0	2018 FIFA World Cup and 2019 AFC Asian Cup qualification	
47	8 October 2015	Al-Seeb Stadium, Al-Seeb, Oman	Syria	2–0	3–0	2018 FIFA World Cup and 2019 AFC Asian Cup qualification	
48	24 March 2016	Saitama Stadium 2002, Saitama, Japan	Afghanistan	1–0	5–0	2018 FIFA World Cup and 2019 AFC Asian Cup qualification	
49	3 June 2016	Toyota Stadium, Toyota, Japan	Bulgaria	1–0	7–2	2016 Kirin Cup	
50	28 March 2017	Saitama Stadium 2002, Saitama, Japan	Thailand	2–0	4–0	2018 FIFA World Cup qualification	

== Honours ==
VfB Stuttgart

- DFB-Pokal runner-up: 2012–13

Leicester City

- Premier League: 2015–16

SD Huesca

- Segunda División: 2019–20

Japan

- AFC Asian Cup: 2011
- Kirin Cup: 2009, 2011

Individual

- J.League Best XI: 2009
- IFFHS World's Top Goal Scorer: 2009
- AFC International Footballer of the Year: 2016
- Best Footballer in Asia: 2016

== See also ==
- List of men's footballers with 100 or more international caps
- List of men's footballers with 50 or more international goals
