= Justin Gerlach =

German footballer (born 1990)

Personal information
- Full name: Justin Rafael Steven Gerlach
- Date of birth: 2 February 1990 (age 36)
- Place of birth: West Berlin
- Height: 1.94 m (6 ft 4 in)
- Position: Centre back

Team information
- Current team: Optik Rathenow
- Number: 24

Youth career
- MSV Normannia 08
- –2002: 1. FC Lübars
- 2002–2009: Hertha BSC

Senior career*
Years	Team	Apps	(Gls)
2008–2010	Hertha BSC II	12	(0)
2010–2011	TSG Neustrelitz	29	(0)
2011–2013	Berliner AK 07	63	(0)
2013–2019	Carl Zeiss Jena	152	(5)
2014–2019	Carl Zeiss Jena II	10	(0)
2019–2021	Berliner AK 07	33	(2)
2021–2024	CFC Hertha 06	70	(1)
2024–	Optik Rathenow	15	(0)
- * Club domestic league appearances and goals as of 8 June 2024

Justin Rafael Steven Gerlach (born 2 February 1990) is a German footballer who plays as a defender for Optik Rathenow.

== Career ==
On 12 June 2019 it was confirmed, that Gerlach had returned to Berliner AK 07 on a 2-year contract.
