= Stefan Vogler =

German footballer

Personal information
- Date of birth: August 13, 1990 (age 36)
- Place of birth: Sigmaringen, West Germany
- Height: 1.85 m (6 ft 1 in)
- Position: Forward

Youth career
- FV Veringenstadt
- –2007: SC Pfullendorf
- 2007–2009: SC Freiburg

Senior career*
Years	Team	Apps	(Gls)
2009–2010	Bahlinger SC	33	(22)
2010–2014	Greuther Fürth II	34	(12)
2010–2013	Greuther Fürth	3	(0)
2011–2013	→ Kickers Offenbach (loan)	62	(10)
2014–2015	SC Pfullendorf	29	(19)
2015–2019	TSG Balingen	79	(28)
- * Club domestic league appearances and goals

Stefan Vogler (born August 13, 1990) is a retired German footballer who played as a forward.
