= Arthur Boka =

Ivorian footballer

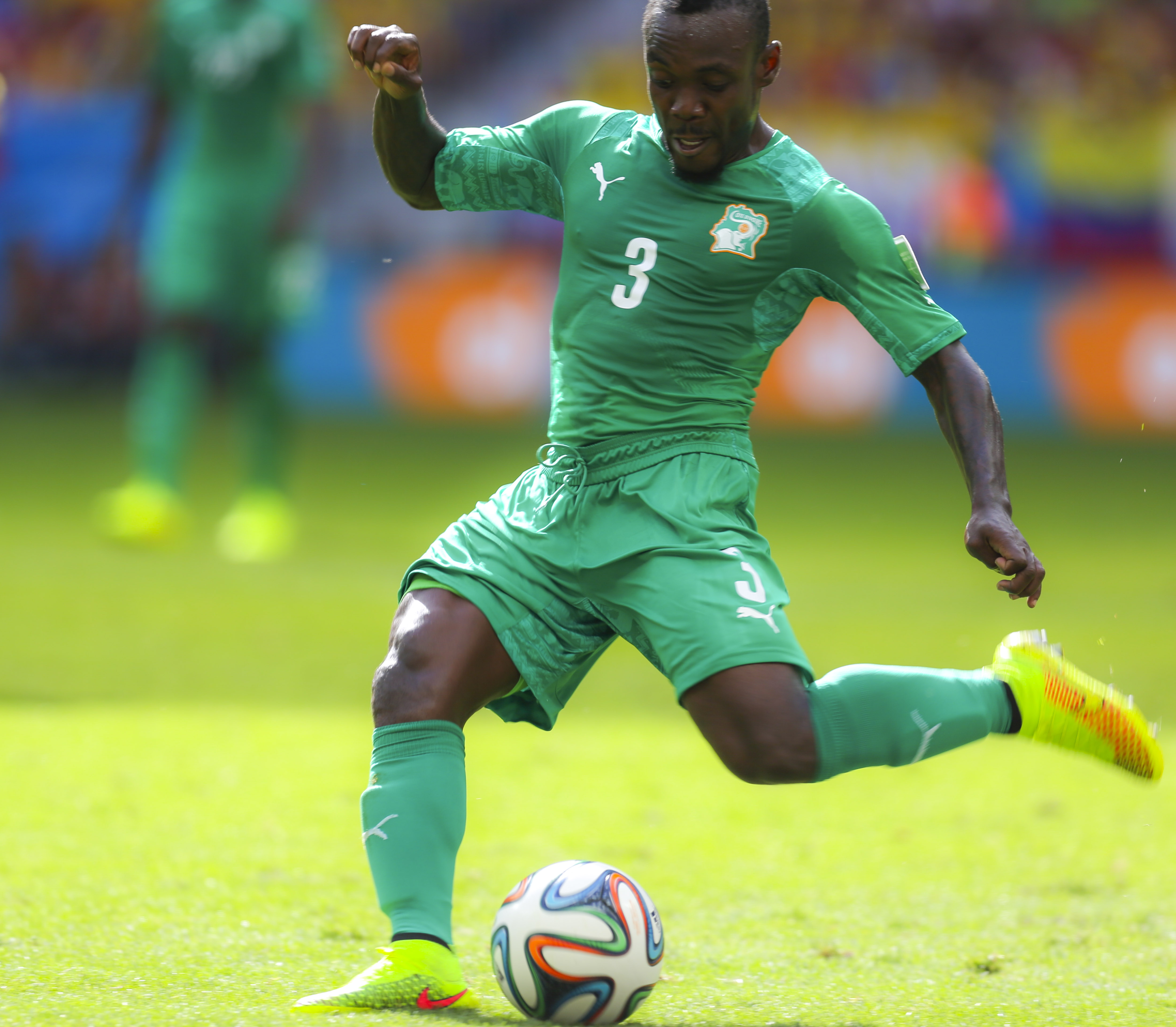
- Boka playing for Ivory Coast against Colombia at the 2014 FIFA World Cup

Personal information
- Full name: Etienne Arthur Boka
- Date of birth: 2 April 1983 (age 43)
- Place of birth: Abidjan, Ivory Coast
- Height: 1.66 m (5 ft 5 in)
- Position: Left back

Youth career
- 1996–2002: ASEC Mimosas

Senior career*
Years	Team	Apps	(Gls)
2002–2004	Beveren	59	(4)
2004–2006	Strasbourg	66	(2)
2006–2014	VfB Stuttgart	154	(5)
2014–2016	Málaga	37	(0)
2016–2017	Sion	3	(0)
2022	Atlético de Marbella	10	(0)

International career^{‡}
2004–2015	Ivory Coast	82	(1)
- * Club domestic league appearances and goals as of 15 May 2022 ‡ National team caps and goals as of 00:00, 17 November 2015 (UTC)

Etienne Arthur Boka (born 2 April 1983) is an Ivorian former professional footballer who played as a left back for the Ivory Coast national team. At club level, he last played for Atlético de Marbella in the seventh-tier Primera Andaluza.

He was a part of the Ivory Coast squads at two FIFA World Cups and five Africa Cups of Nations between 2006 and 2013. Boka is known for his lightning pace even though he is a man of a very small build.

== Club career ==
Like many successful players from Ivory Coast, he started his career at homeland club ASEC Abidjan, after coming through their much famed youth system, that has also produced players such as Kolo Touré, Emmanuel Eboué, and Aruna Dindane. He joined the club after walking in from the streets of Ivory Coast capital Abidjan and asking for a trial. Following his graduation from the academy he moved on to Belgian club K.S.K. Beveren in 2002, where impressive performances earned him a transfer to the then Ligue 1 club RC Strasbourg in France for the 2004–05 season. He impressed further at Strasbourg, but following their relegation at the end of the 2005–06 season he left to join German top-flight club VfB Stuttgart. His impressive attack minded play from his left-back position have earned him the nickname of "The African Roberto Carlos". In the 2006–07 season Boka won the Bundesliga title with VfB Stuttgart.

On 14 January 2009 he extended his contract at VfB Stuttgart until the summer of 2012. On 30 May 2012, Boka signed a new one-year contract with an option for a further year at VfB Stuttgart. Boka used to be playing as left back, but in the middle of 2012–13 Bundesliga season he began playing as defensive midfielder. On 1 May 2014, Boka agreed a transfer to Spanish La Liga side Málaga CF, signing a two-year deal with the Andalusians. He made his debut in the competition on 29 August, starting in a 0–3 away loss against Valencia CF. He joined Swiss team FC Sion in July 2016 but left in February 2017 after just three Super League appearances.

== International career ==
Boka has 72 caps for the Ivory Coast, scored one goal, and was called up to the 2006 World Cup, where he played all three group games for the Elephants, where he performed impressively, gaining one assist. He was also called up to the 2010 World Cup, where he played the final group match against North Korea gaining two assists.

He represented Ivory Coast in the 2006 Africa Cup of Nations and was also part of the Ivorian squad at the 2008 Africa Cup of Nations in Ghana. Boka was also called up for the 2010 Africa Cup of Nations, the 2012 Africa Cup of Nations and the 2013 Africa Cup of Nations. With Ivory Coast, Boka reached the finals of the Africa Cup of Nations in 2006 and 2012, but they were beaten on penalties on both occasions.

== Career statistics ==
As of 29 August 2014

Club	Division	Season	League		Cups		Europe		Total	
Club	Division	Season	Apps	Goals	Apps	Goals	Apps	Goals	Apps	Goals
Beveren	Jupiler Pro League	2002–03	30	3	1	0	0	0	31	3
Beveren	Jupiler Pro League	2003–04	29	1	5	0	0	0	34	1
Beveren	Total		59	4	6	0	0	0	65	4
Strasbourg	Ligue 1	2004–05	34	0	6	0	0	0	40	0
Strasbourg	Ligue 1	2005–06	27	0	3	0	8	1	38	1
Strasbourg	Ligue 2	2006–07	5	2	0	0	0	0	5	2
Strasbourg	Total		66	2	9	0	8	1	83	3
VfB Stuttgart	Bundesliga	2006–07	19	1	3	0	0	0	22	1
VfB Stuttgart	Bundesliga	2007–08	17	0	3	0	3	0	23	0
VfB Stuttgart	Bundesliga	2008–09	18	0	2	0	9	0	29	0
VfB Stuttgart	Bundesliga	2009–10	14	0	2	0	6	0	22	0
VfB Stuttgart	Bundesliga	2010–11	23	2	2	0	5	0	30	2
VfB Stuttgart	Bundesliga	2011–12	13	0	1	0	0	0	14	0
VfB Stuttgart	Bundesliga	2012–13	25	1	5	1	8	1	38	3
VfB Stuttgart	Bundesliga	2013–14	25	1	0	0	4	0	29	1
VfB Stuttgart	Total		154	5	18	1	35	1	207	7
Málaga	La Liga	2014–15	23	0	3	0	0	0	26	0
Málaga	La Liga	2015–16	1	0	0	0	0	0	1	0
Málaga	Total		24	0	3	0	0	0	27	0
Career total			303	11	36	1	43	2	382	14

=== International goals ===
As of 9 March 2017

#	Date	Venue	Opponent	Score	Result	Competition
1	18 August 2004	Parc des Sports, Avignon, France	Senegal	2–1	Win	Friendly match

== Honours ==
=== Club ===
Beveren

- Belgian Cup runner-up: 2003–04

Strasbourg

- Coupe de la Ligue: 2004–05

VfB Stuttgart

- Bundesliga winner: 2006–07
- DFB-Pokal runner-up: 2006–07, 2012–13

=== International ===
Ivory Coast

- Africa Cup of Nations runner-up: 2006, 2010
