= Sebastian Szimayer =

German footballer

Personal information
- Date of birth: 15 May 1990 (age 36)
- Place of birth: Heilbronn, Germany
- Height: 1.88 m (6 ft 2 in)
- Position: Forward

Youth career
- VfB Bad Rappenau
- SV Sandhausen
- –2008: 1899 Hoffenheim

Senior career*
Years	Team	Apps	(Gls)
2008–2011	SV Wehen Wiesbaden II	65	(9)
2010–2011	SV Wehen Wiesbaden	1	(0)
2011–2013	SGS Großaspach	60	(12)
2013–2014	Waldhof Mannheim	18	(3)
2014–2015	SpVgg Neckarelz	30	(14)
2015–2016	Rot-Weiß Erfurt	26	(3)
2016–2017	Eintracht Trier	25	(2)
2017–2018	Hessen Kassel	32	(11)
2018–2019	Racing-Union	21	(4)
2019–2021	UNA Strassen	40	(12)
- * Club domestic league appearances and goals

Sebastian Szimayer (born 15 May 1990) is a German former footballer who played as a forward.
