= Schweinfurt =

- Town
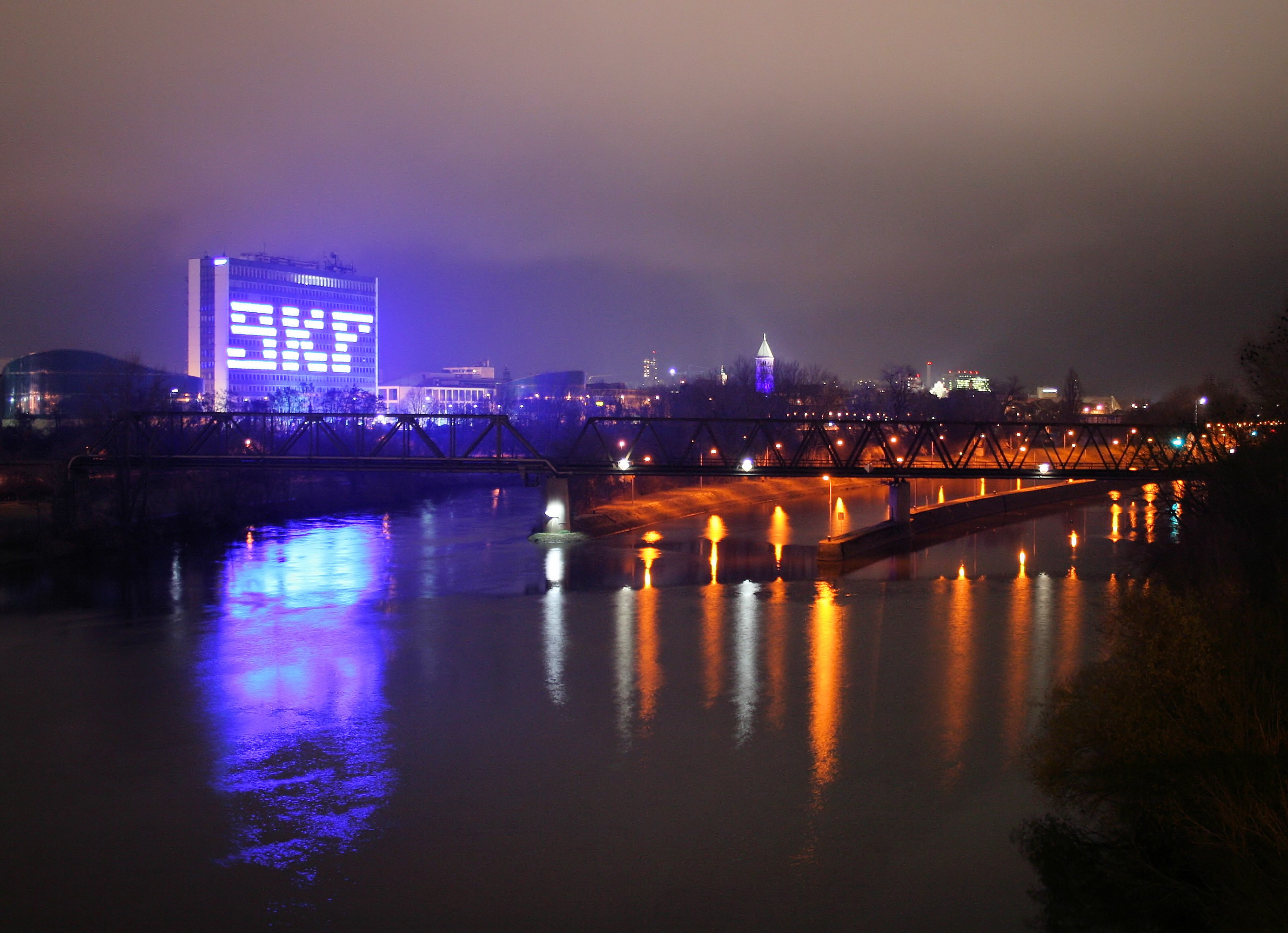
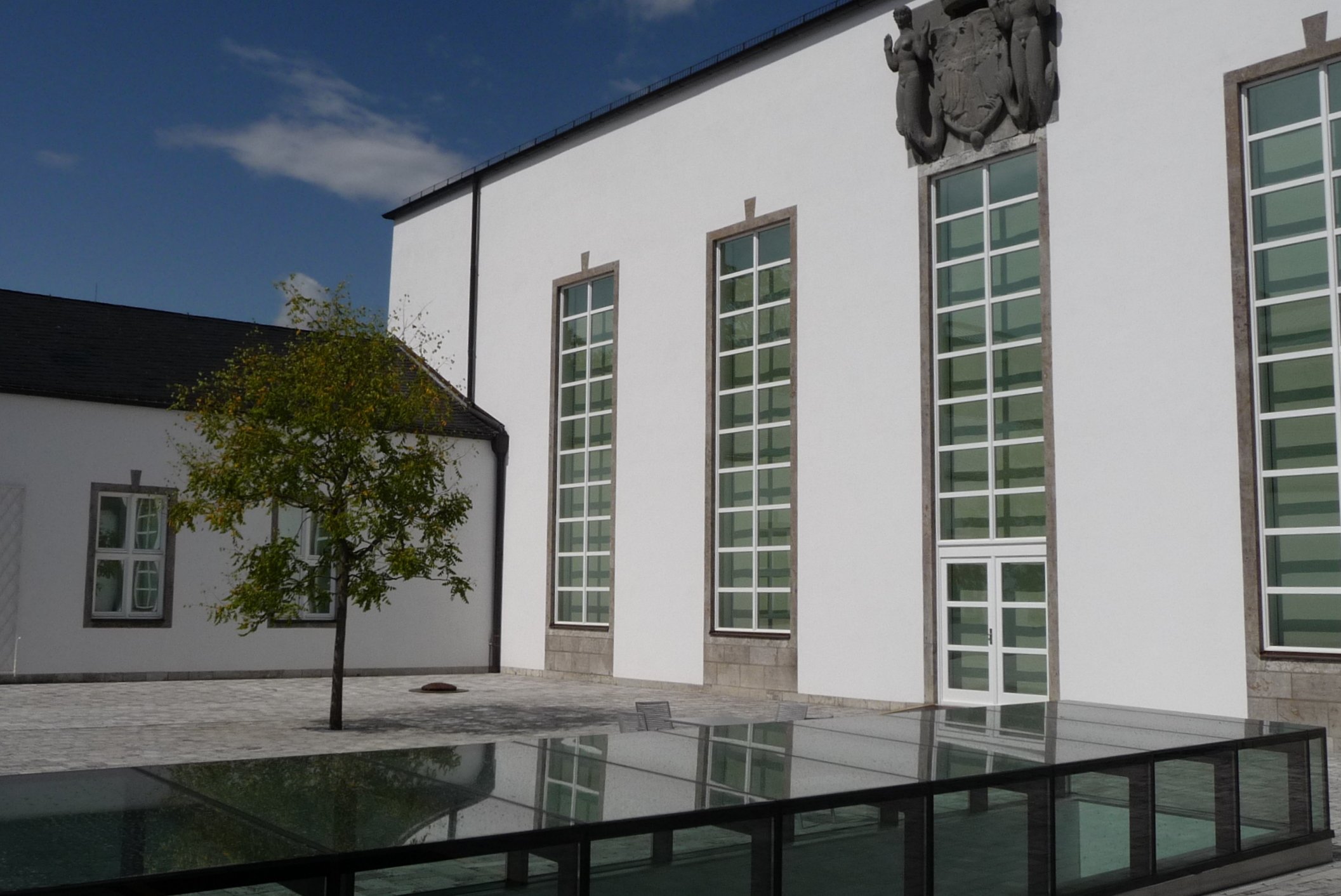
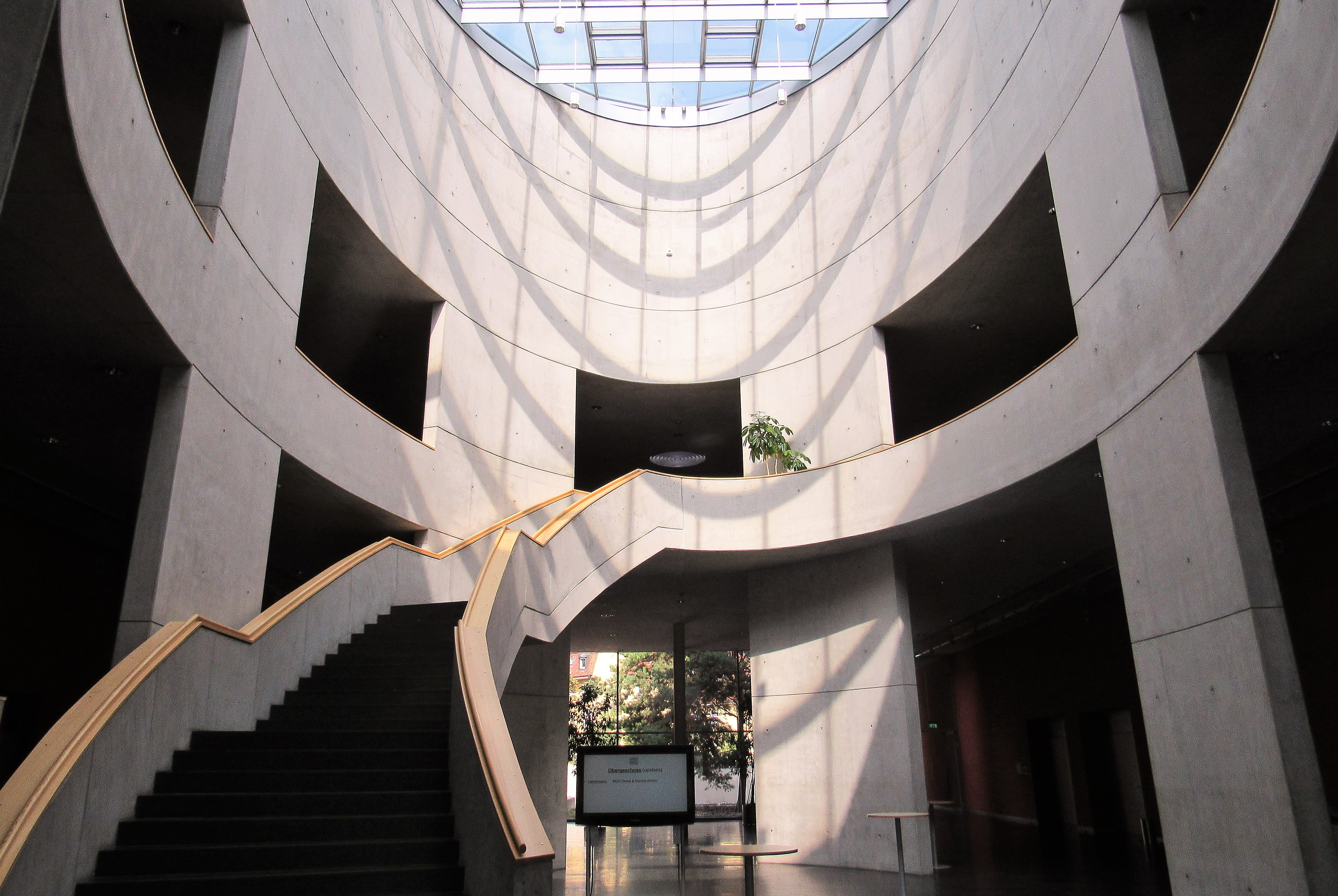
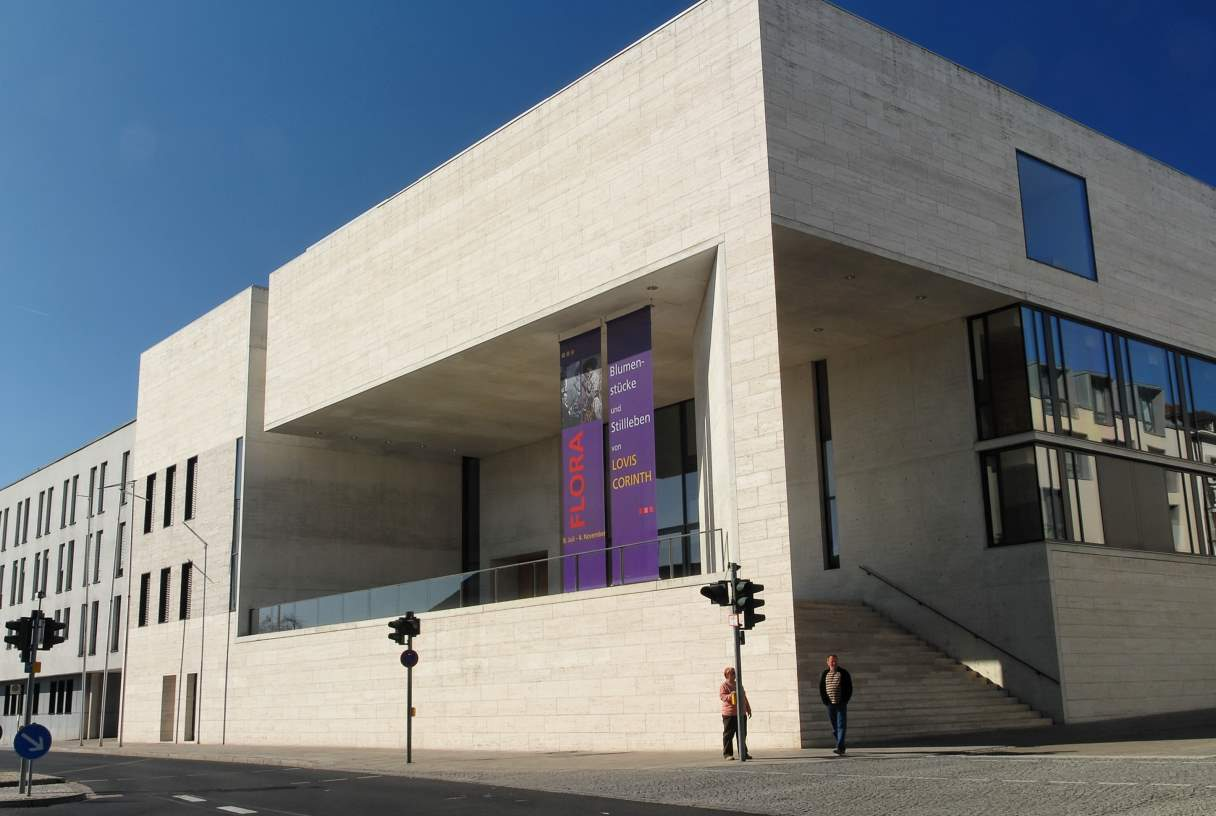
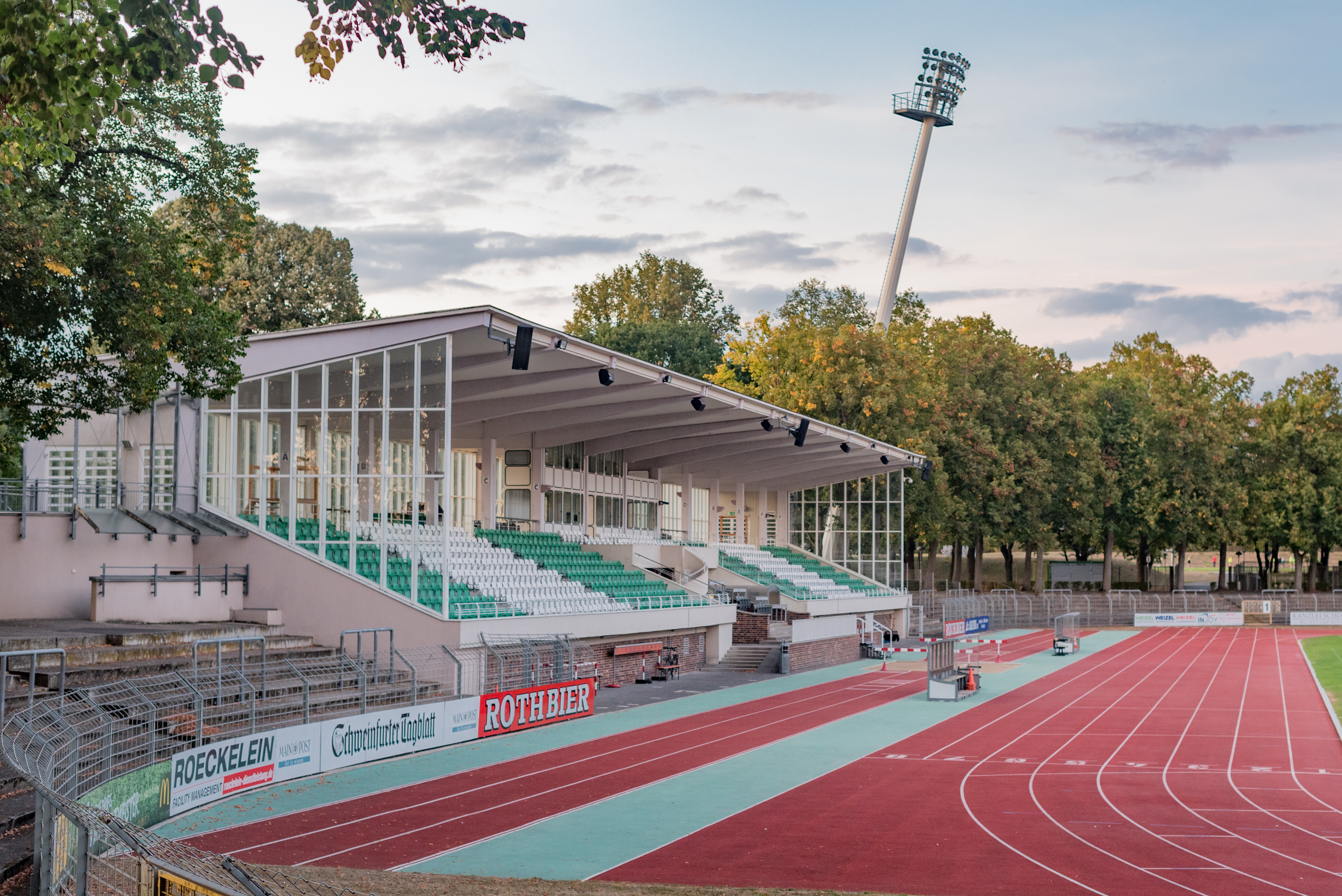
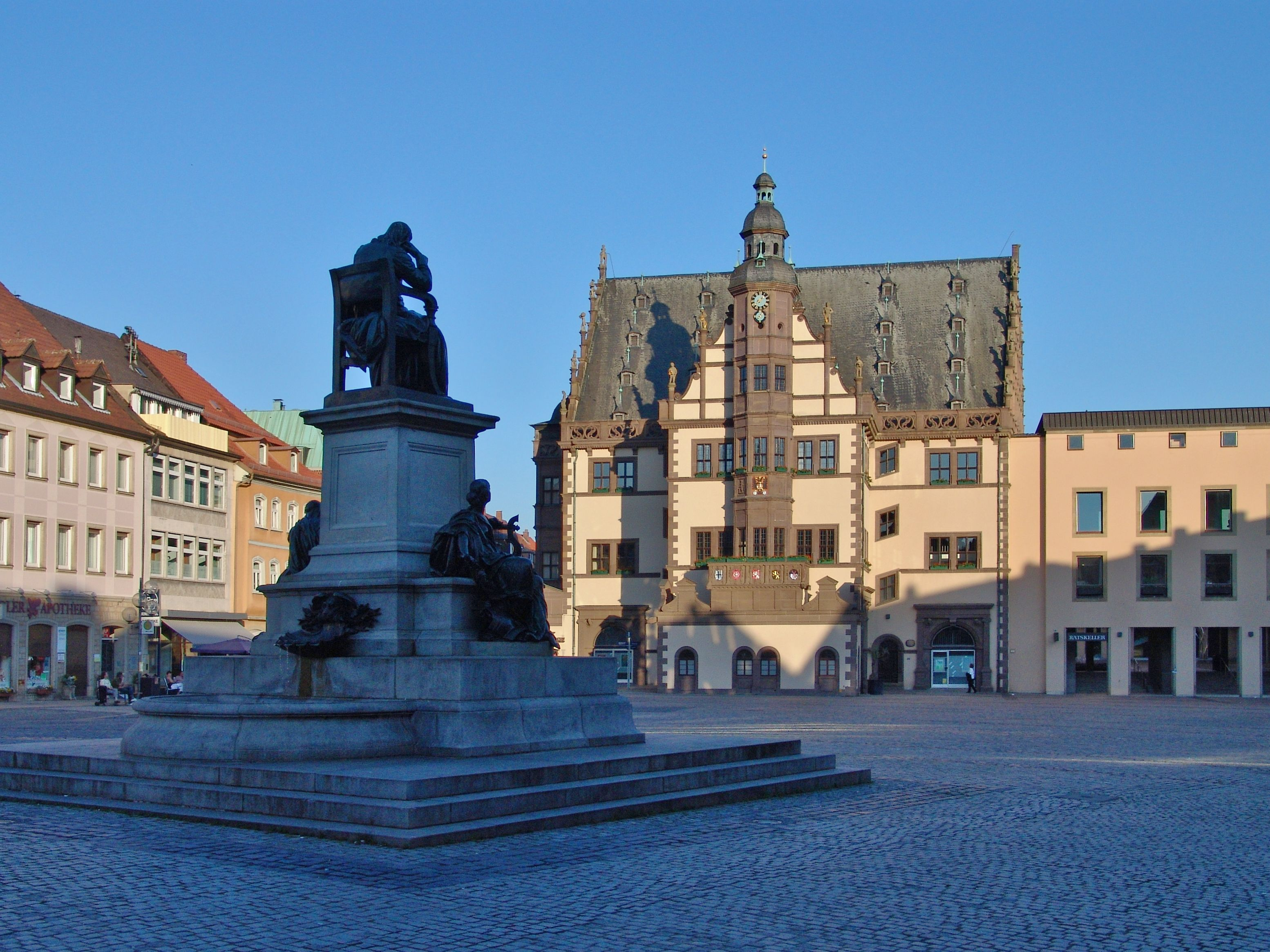
- Clockwise from top: Skyline at night, Maininsel Conference Center, Willy-Sachs-Stadion, Marketplace with the Old Town Hall, Museum Georg Schäfer, Art Gallery

- Flag Coat of arms
- Interactive map of Schweinfurt
- Location within Germany Location within Bavaria
- Coordinates: 50°3′N 10°14′E
- Country: Germany
- State: Bavaria
- Admin. region: Lower Franconia
- District: Urban district

Government
  - Mayor (2026–32): Ralf Hofmann (SPD)

Area
  - Total: 35.7 km^{2} (13.8 sq mi)
- Elevation: 226 m (741 ft)

Population (2025-12-31)
  - Total: 54,539
  - Density: 1,530/km^{2} (3,960/sq mi)
- Time zone: UTC+01:00 (CET)
  - Summer (DST): UTC+02:00 (CEST)
- Postal codes: 97421–97424
- Dialling codes: 09721
- Vehicle registration: SW
- Website: www.schweinfurt.de

Schweinfurt (/ˈʃvaɪnfʊərt/ SHVYNE-foort, German: [ˈʃvaɪnfʊʁt]; lit. 'Swine Ford') is a city in the district of Lower Franconia in Bavaria, Germany. It is the administrative centre of the surrounding district (Landkreis) of Schweinfurt and a major industrial, cultural and educational hub. The urban agglomeration has 100,200 (2018) and the city's catchment area, including the Main-Rhön region and parts of South Thuringia, 759,000 inhabitants.

Schweinfurt was first documented in 791 and is one of the oldest cities in Bavaria. Around 1000 the Margraves of Schweinfurt controlled large parts of northern Bavaria. From the 12th century until 1802 Schweinfurt was a Free imperial city within the Holy Roman Empire; around 1700 it became a centre of humanist activity, and in 1770 the city's 250-year industrial history began.

During World War II, the Americans suffered their biggest air defeat over Schweinfurt in the Second Raid on Schweinfurt (Black Thursday). On 11 April 1945, the US Army invaded the city. During the Cold War, the USAG Schweinfurt had the highest concentration of US combat units in the Federal Republic of Germany. In the northwest of Schweinfurt, an American town emerged, with a complete civil infrastructure including all kinds of shops for 12,000 Americans, soldiers and civilians. Until the withdrawal of the US Army at Schweinfurt in 2014, a total of about 100,000 US soldiers were stationed in the town.

Following German Reunification in 1990, Schweinfurt has become an important traffic hub in the centre of Germany. It has the highest employment density (2015) and the third highest gross domestic product per inhabitant of Germany (2014). The world's largest bearing group SKF, the second largest Schaeffler, the second largest automotive supplier in the world ZF Friedrichshafen and the DAX group Fresenius Medical Care have their largest plants in Schweinfurt.

Some important inventions have their origin in Schweinfurt: the pedal bike by Philipp Moritz Fischer (1853) as well as the freewheel (1889) and the coaster brake (1903) by Ernst Sachs. In 1652, the oldest permanently existing natural-scientific academy in the world was founded in Schweinfurt, the German National Academy of Sciences Leopoldina.

== History ==
=== Pre-BCE History ===
Traces of settlement as early as 7500 years ago can be detected on today's urban area at various places. The first settlement of the historic Schweinfurt (Village Old Town) was also on the Main, between the two streams Höllenbach and Marienbach, 1 km east of the later founded imperial city, which corresponds to the old town today. The Village Old Town is in its origins at least 2100 years old.

=== 8th–13th centuries ===
The first documentary mention Schweinfurts (village old town) took place in the year 791. Schweinfurt gained importance in 941 with the mention of Count Berthold as the first member of the House of the Counts of Schweinfurt. He occupied an important position in the central Reich territory, the Duchy of Franconia. Berthold gave the king of East Francia Otto I. (936–973), who in 962 became Roman-German Emperor, valuable weapons aid against rebellious tribal dukes. As thanks Berthold of Otto I received the counties for the Folkfeld- and the Radenzgau and the Margraviate for the Nordgau, about the present-day Upper Palatinate. Thus he was and from 980 his son Henry the most powerful secular nobility in the area of today's northern Bavaria.

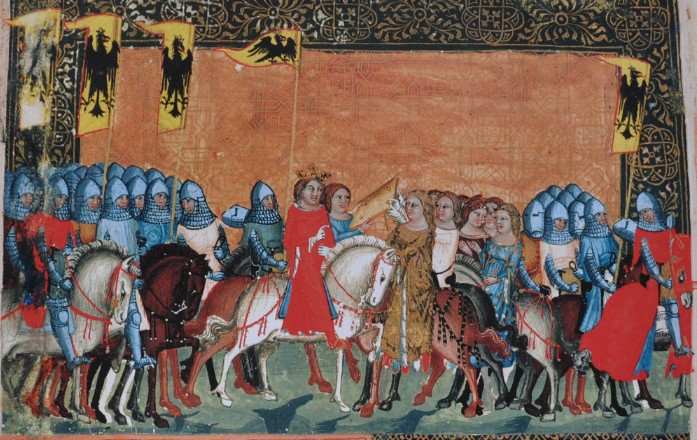
Judith von Schweinfurt (centre) (depiction from the 14th century)

Later supported Count Henry of Schweinfurt (called: Hezilo) the East Frankish Henry II (1002–1024, from 1014 Roman-German Emperor) in the royal election of 1002 and was awarded the Duke dignity of Bavarians. After the election, however, Henry II did not fulfill the promise. Thereupon it came to the Schweinfurt Feud in 1003. Count Heinrich lost all his possessions. The confiscated royal goods formed the core of the new bishopric of Bamberg. Hezilo, however, retained his possessions around the castle hill Peterstirn. The family, in which Judith of Schweinfurt became a central figure in the history of the old Schweinfurt city, died in the male line of 1057 and at the latest this year marks the undisputed end of the important role of the Margraves of Schweinfurt.

To the beginnings of today's old town from the 12th century, 1 km west of the previous settlement between the two streams Marienbach and Höllenbach, there are different views. The from a gradual construction to a planned Civitas Imperii (imperial city), so a founding city, by Emperor Frederick I Barbarossa, using existing royal estate, rich. In the struggle for supremacy in Main Franconia (region around the river Main) between the Henneberger and the Bishop of Würzburg, the city was destroyed between 1240 and 1250 (First City Spoilage). However, it is controversial whether this destruction was still in the old settlement between Höllenbach and Marienbach and thus a reason for the rebuilding of the city on the farther west, today's site was or whether the destruction took place here already. In a letter from King William of Holland dated January 9, 1254, it is said that Schweinfurt used to be imperial city (... Swinforde, que olim imperii civitas fuerat). It remains unclear whether rights have ever been withdrawn from the city or whether only reference is made to the city's destruction. However, this letter is the first documentary evidence of Schweinfurt as imperial city and thus as a place with city rights.

=== 13th–15th centuries ===
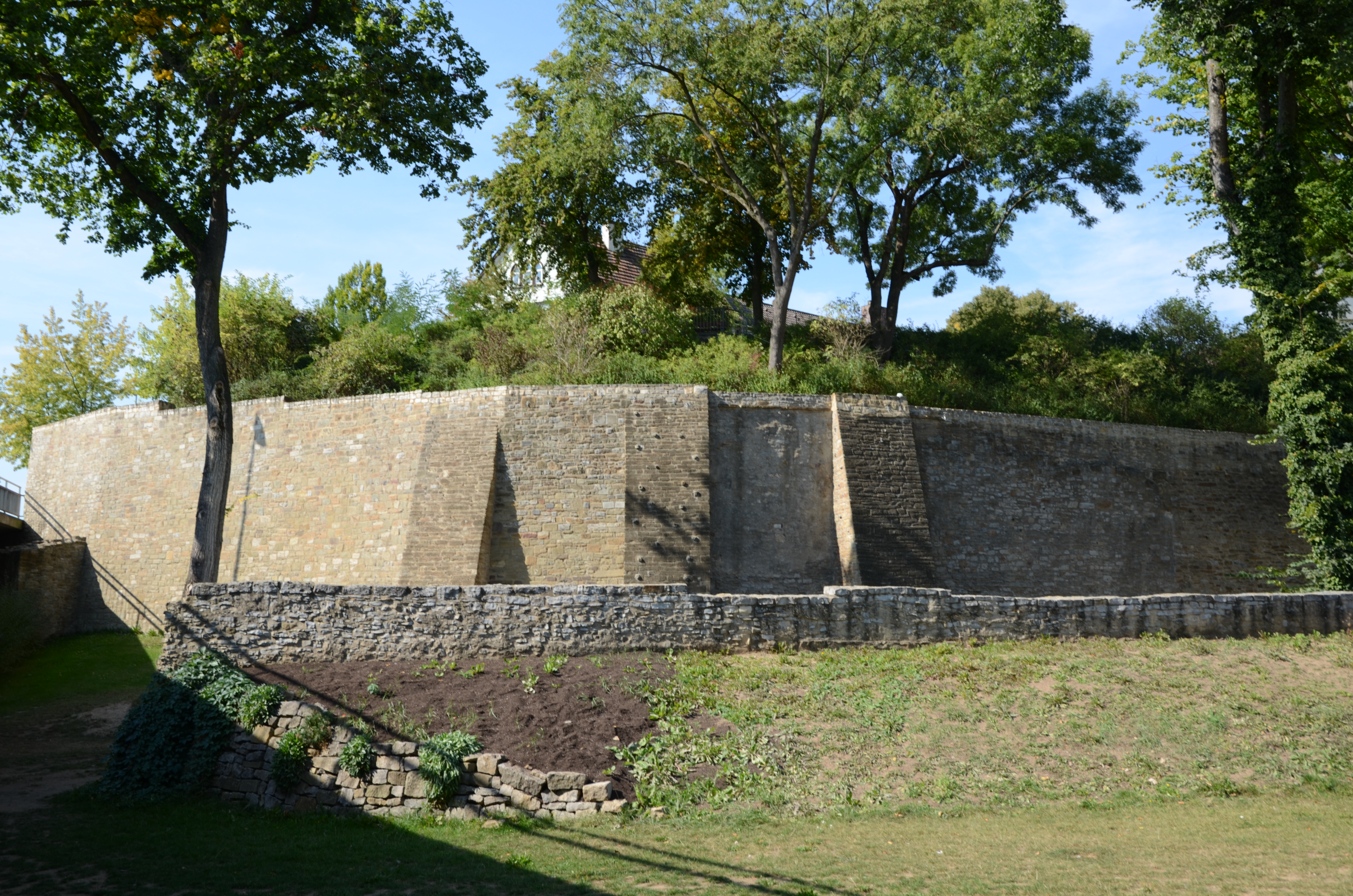
Restored walls of the former Reichsburg at the old city district Zürch

The (inner) city fortification of the new city was built and first documented in 1258, it is still largely preserved on Marienbach today. A document from 1282 signed by Rudolf I of Habsburg states that Schweinfurt was a free city within the Holy Roman Empire. By pledge 1309 Schweinfurt came to the House of Henneberg, who maintained from 1310 to 1427 a Reichsburg (castle of the empire) in the old Schweinfurt city district Zürch.

In the 15th century began the construction of a territory around the core city, which lasted until 1620. In 1436, the fishermen's settlement of Fischerrain, which borders on the city wall and lies just to the southwest, whose origins lie in the darkness of history, was incorporated into the city. Due to positive economic development, the city can acquire the suburb of Oberndorf in 1436. 1436/37 received the advice of the city from the Teutonic Knights for 18,000 guilders the castle on the Peterstirn and the associated land area with the villages Zell and Weipoltshausen, which belongs to Üchtelhausen today.

=== 16th–18th centuries ===
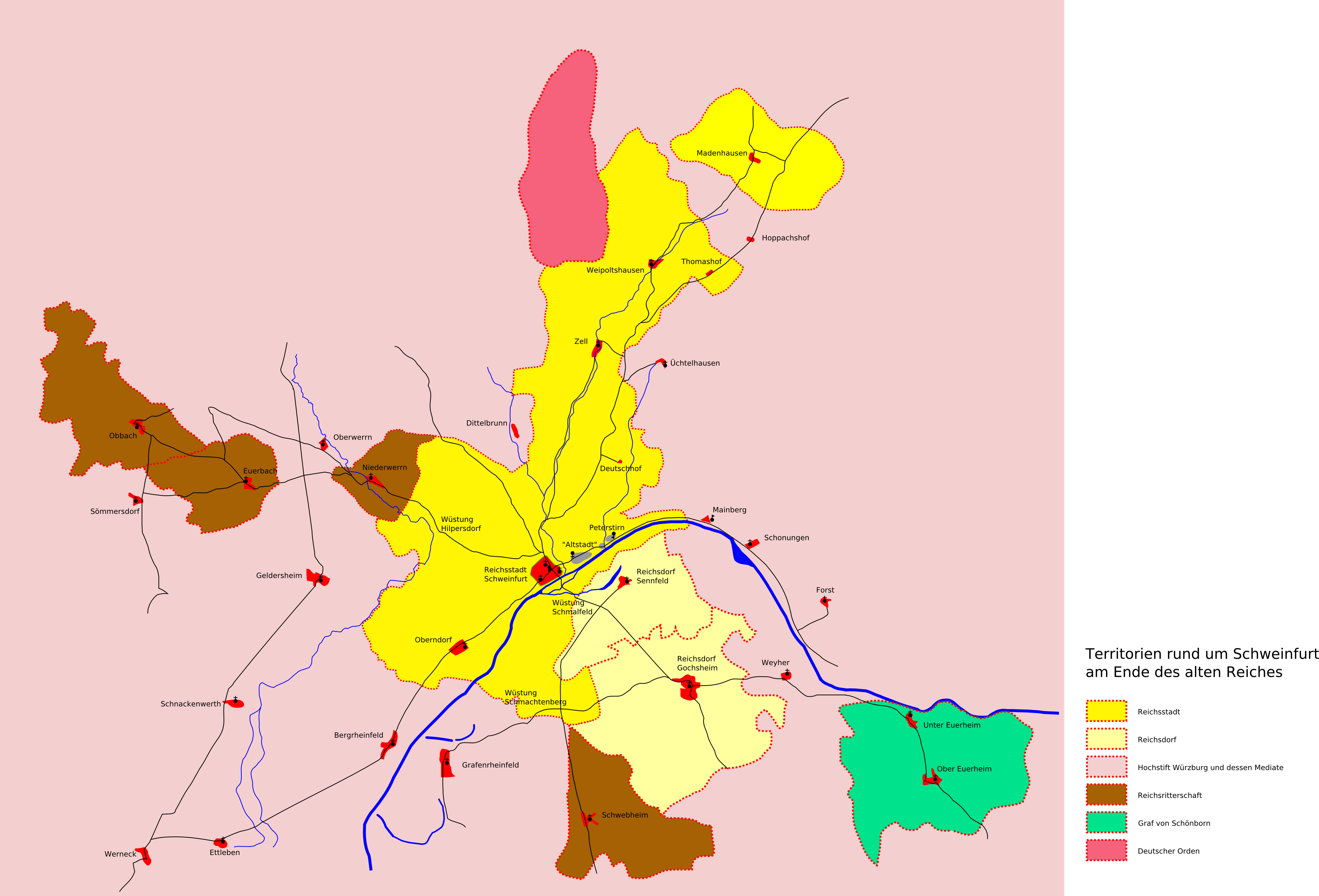
Imperial city Schweinfurt Territory 1620–1802, and surrounding areas

Schweinfurt joined the Reformation relatively late, in 1542 since the city, together with neighboring imperial villages and imperial villages, was completely surrounded by the Catholic Hochstift Würzburg. In a confession change had to be expected military assault. The patron of the city, Count Wilhelm von Henneberg, did not offer sufficient support.

In the course of the Second Margrave War, the city was looted in 1554 and set on fire. This went as the Second City Spoilage in the city history (First City Spoilage see: 8th–13th centuries). The reconstruction dragged on until 1615. In this form, the old town, with the exception of later modernized fortifications, remained almost unchanged until the early 19th century. In 1609 the city joined the Protestant Union. The imperial city territory was supplemented 1620 also still around Madenhausen, which also belongs to Üchtelhausen today. Due to the acquisitions, the territory of the imperial city now had an extension of 17 km from southwest to northeast. As a result of the city of Schweinfurt on the knight canton of Baunach a nearly continuous Protestant corridor was created by the Hochstifte Würzburg and Bamberg in the Protestant Duchy of Saxony.

Schweinfurt joined the Protestant Union in 1609. In the Thirty Years' War it was occupied by Gustavus Adolphus, who erected fortifications, the remains of which are still extant. In 1652 the four doctors Johann Laurentius Bausch, Johann Michael Fehr, Georg Balthasar Wolfahrt and Balthasar Metzger founded the Academia Curiosorum in Schweinfurt, which is known today as the German Academy of Life Scientists, "Leopoldina".

Schweinfurt remained a free imperial city until 1802, when it passed to the Electorate of Bavaria. Assigned to the grand duke of Würzburg in 1810, it was granted to the Kingdom of Bavaria four years later. The first railway junction was opened in 1852. In the following years Schweinfurt became a world leading centre for the production of ball bearings. This was to lead to grievous consequences for the city during World War II.

Schweinfurt with buildings after the Second Margrave War

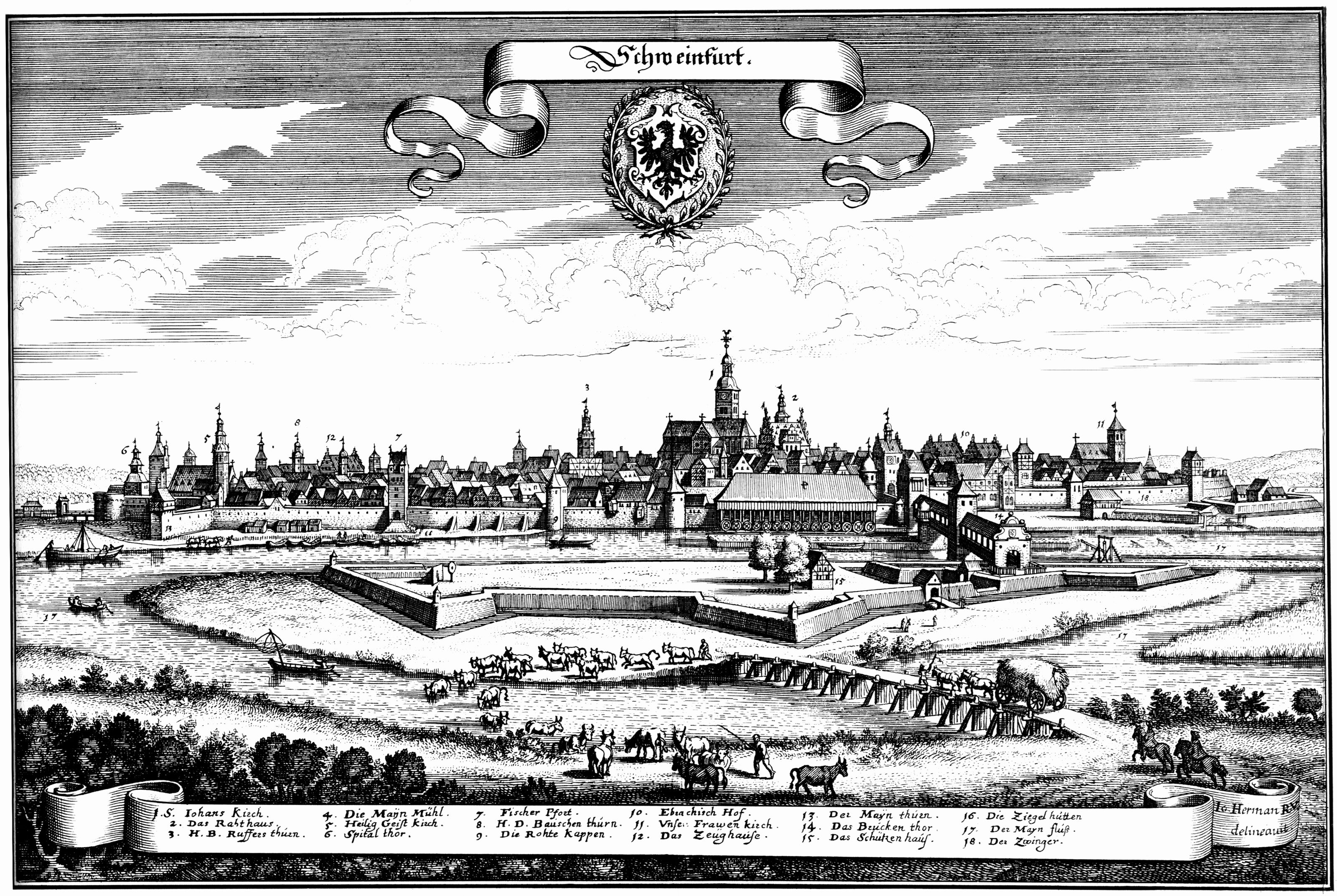
Imperial City of Schweinfurt 1648
Matthäus Merian, Frankfurt a. M.

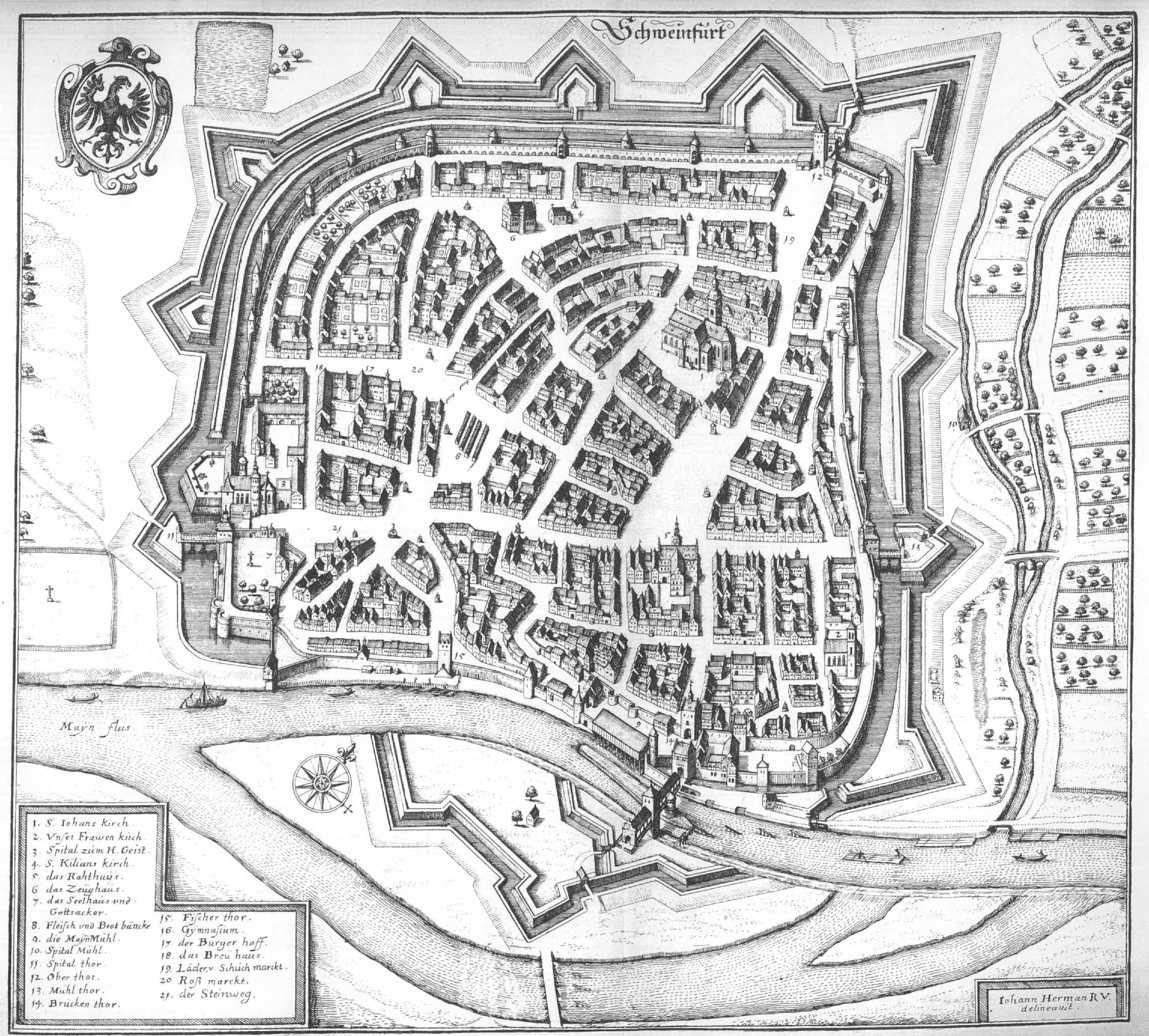
Imperial City of Schweinfurt
in Topographia Franconiae 1656

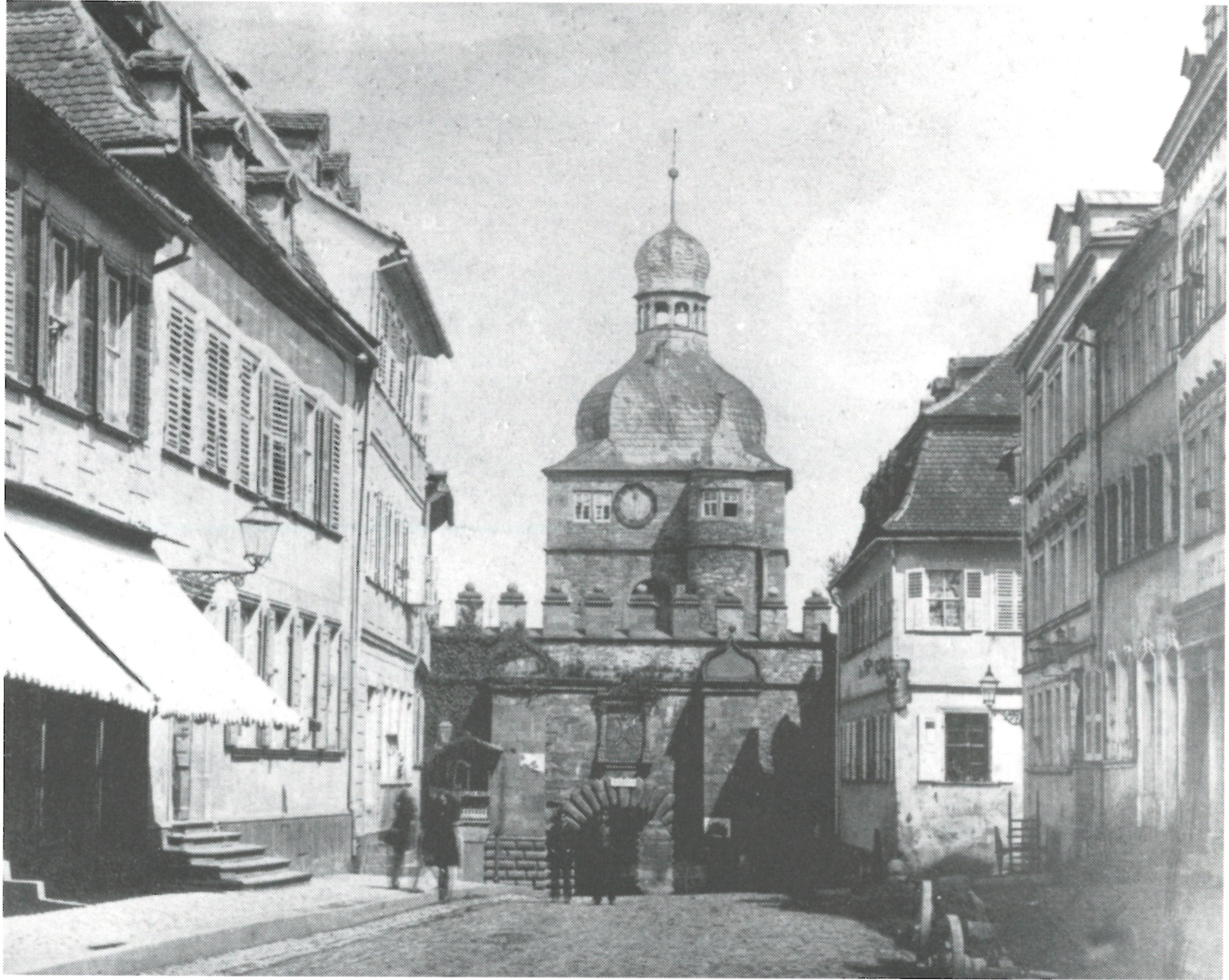
Mühltor (Mill gate) at the end of Mühlgasse
(today Rückertstraße)
(photo before 1876)

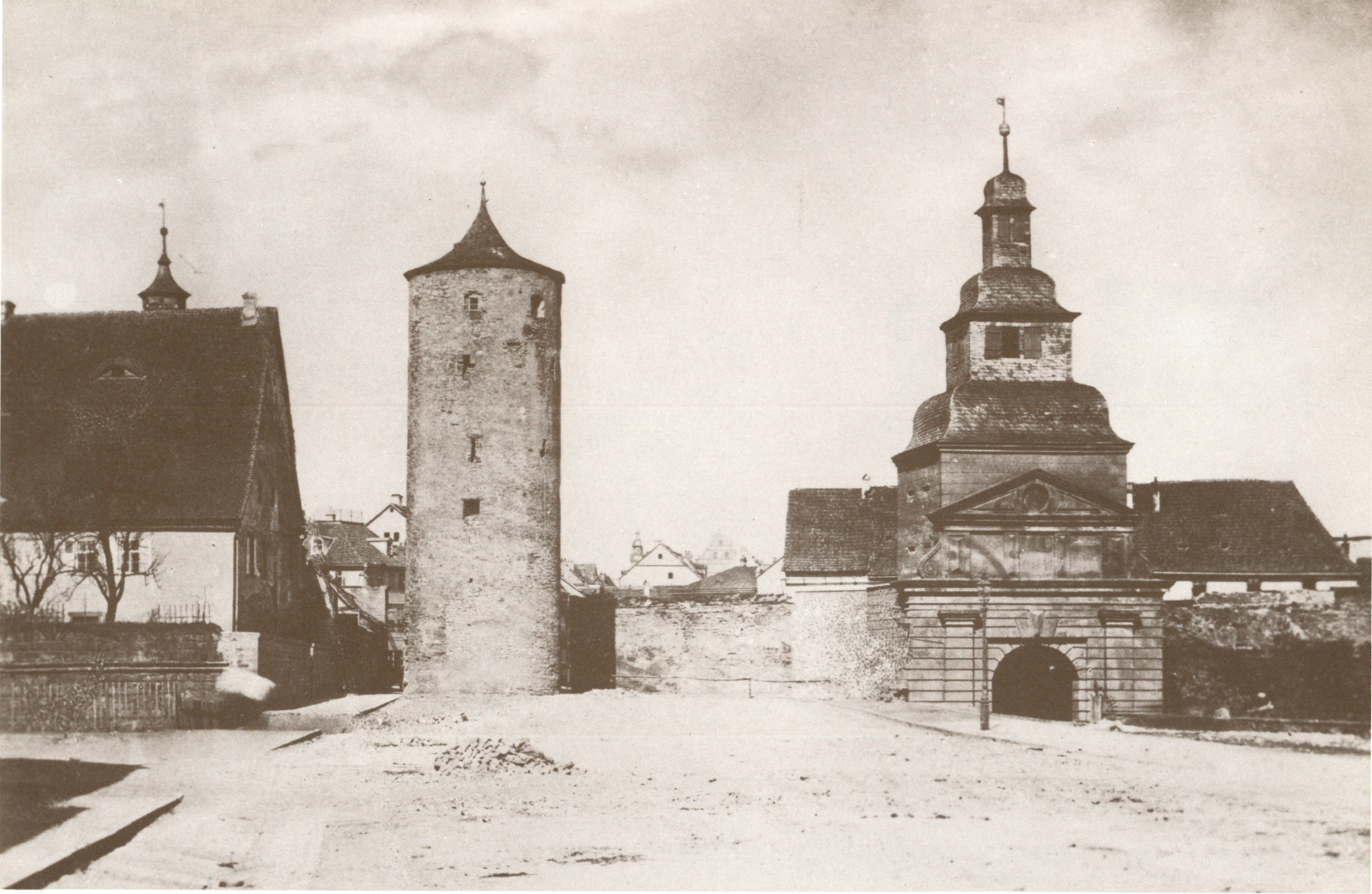
Outer Spitaltor (Spital gate, right)
and Inner Spitaltower (watchtower)
(photo before 1896)

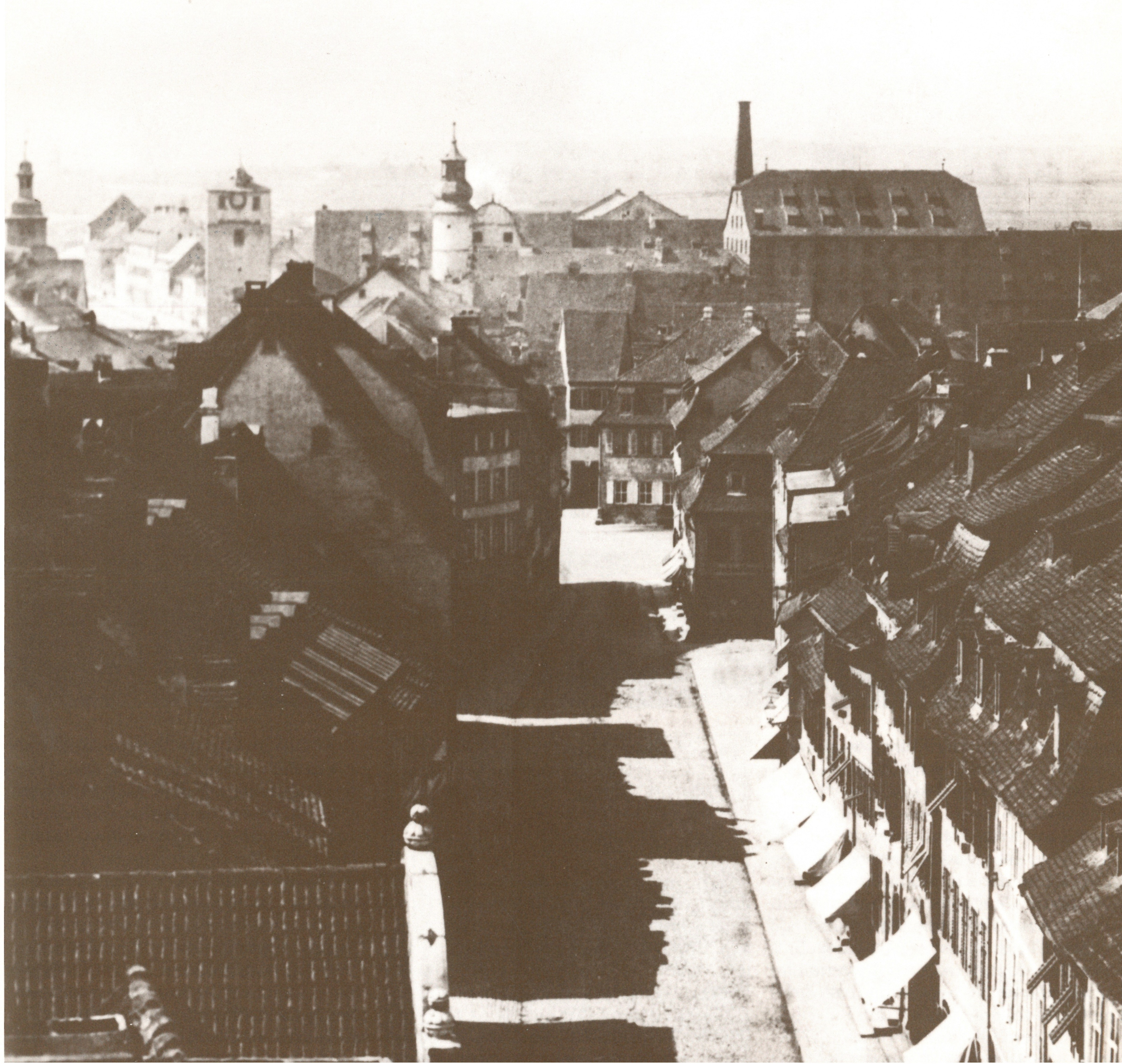
Spitalstrasse, on the horizon Spitaltor (Spital gate) and Spital Church
(photo before 1896)

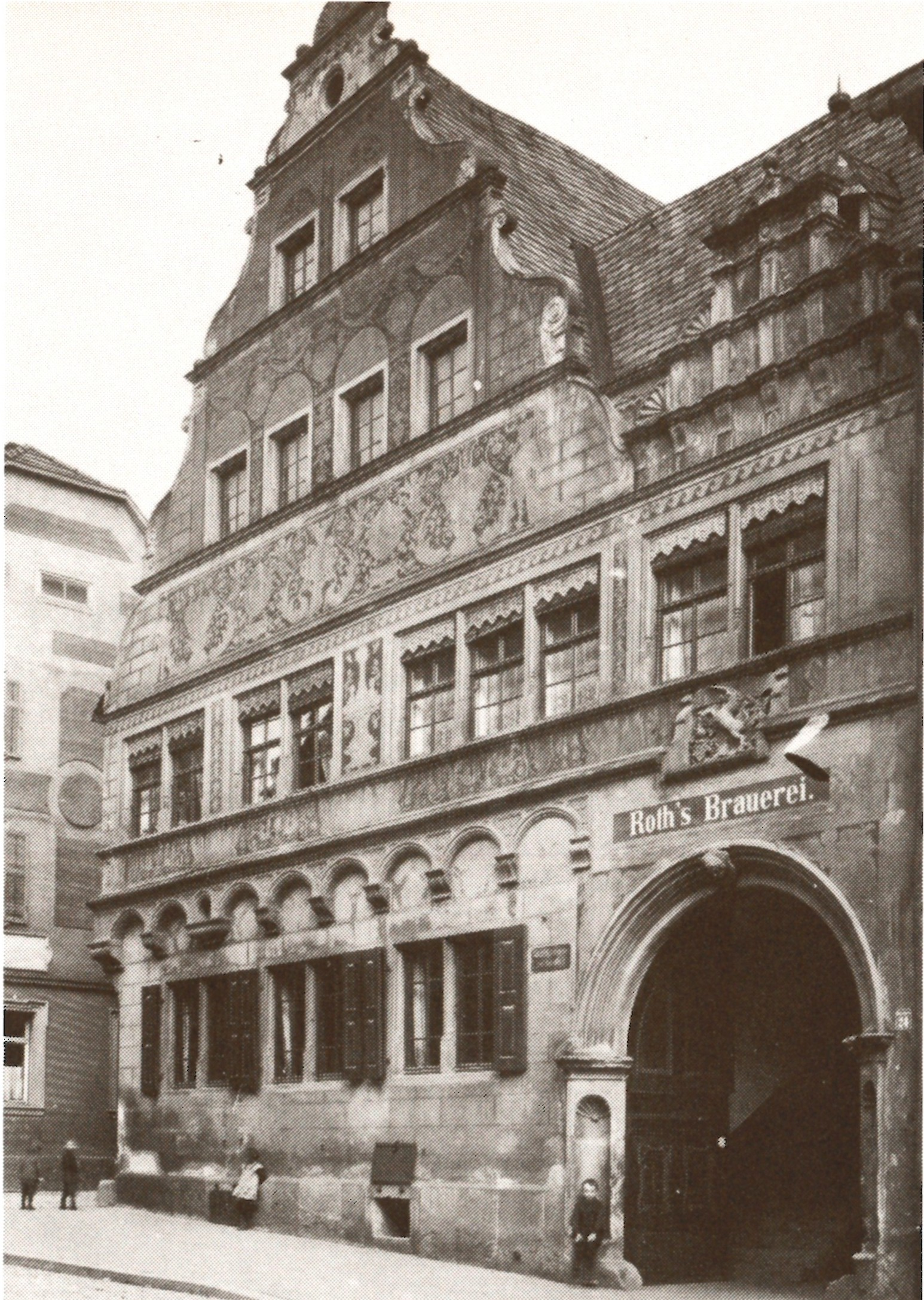
Roth'sches Haus
in the Obere Straße
(photo around 1891)

=== 18th–20th centuries ===
The year 1770 marked the beginning of the industrialization of the city, with its 250-year-old industrial history. In the first century of industrialization, the chemical and paint industry started in Schweinfurt, with the construction of the Wolf's lead white mill at the Bleiweißmühlenwehr. According to Dr. Ferdinand Gademann (1880–1969), it was the oldest German lead white factory. In 1780 the factory was taken over by Johann Martin Schmidt. Further factory-similar plants of this kind originated at the Bellevue and in the neighboring suburb Niederwerrn.

Following the Reichsdeputationshauptschluss, Schweinfurt came to Bavaria in 1803, two years before the Kingdom of Bavaria was founded. 4000 people demonstrated against the Anschluss at the Rossmarkt. After the interim membership of the Grand Duchy of Würzburg (1810–1814), Schweinfurt fell in 1814 to the Kingdom of Bavaria. The villages belonging to the imperial city territory were spun off. As a result, Schweinfurt lost about two-thirds of its territory.

1852 took place with the opening of the Ludwigs-Westbahn from Bamberg to the new Schweinfurt Stadt station the connection to the railway network. With the construction of the line to Bad Kissingen (1871) and the Schweinfurt–Meiningen railway (1874) Schweinfurt became a railway junction. In 1874, a large marshalling and central station was built 3 km west of the city station, at that time on Oberndorf district, the so-called Central Station and today's Schweinfurt Hauptbahnhof at the Bamberg–Rottendorf railway. It was created in a far-sighted manner amidst fields as a passenger and goods main station, with the aim of leaving as much room for the expected industrialization of the station, which also took place here until the end of the 1930s was. The Schweinfurt tram was the first municipal tram in Bavaria from 1895 to 1921 to connect the Schweinfurt Hauptbahnhof with the city centre.

Schweinfurt in the Gründerzeit in the Kingdom of Bavaria

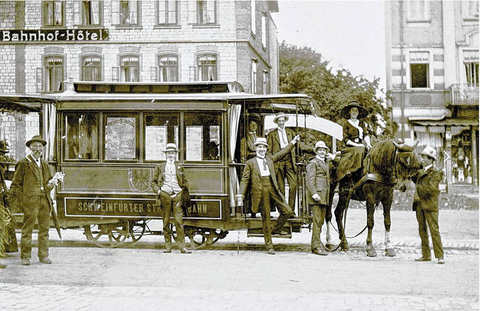
Schweinfurt tram near the
Schweinfurt Hauptbahnhof (central station)

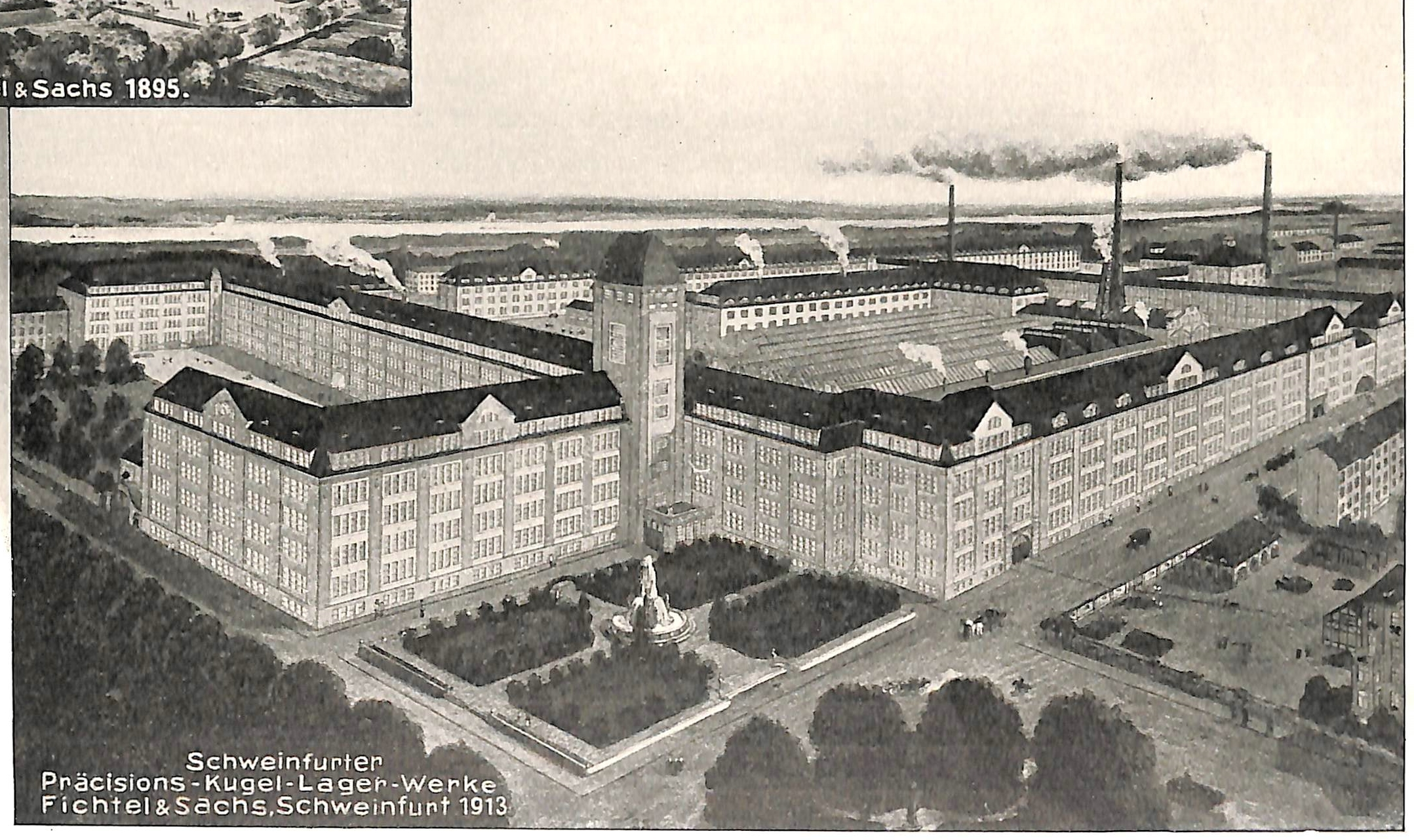
Fichtel & Sachs AG 1913

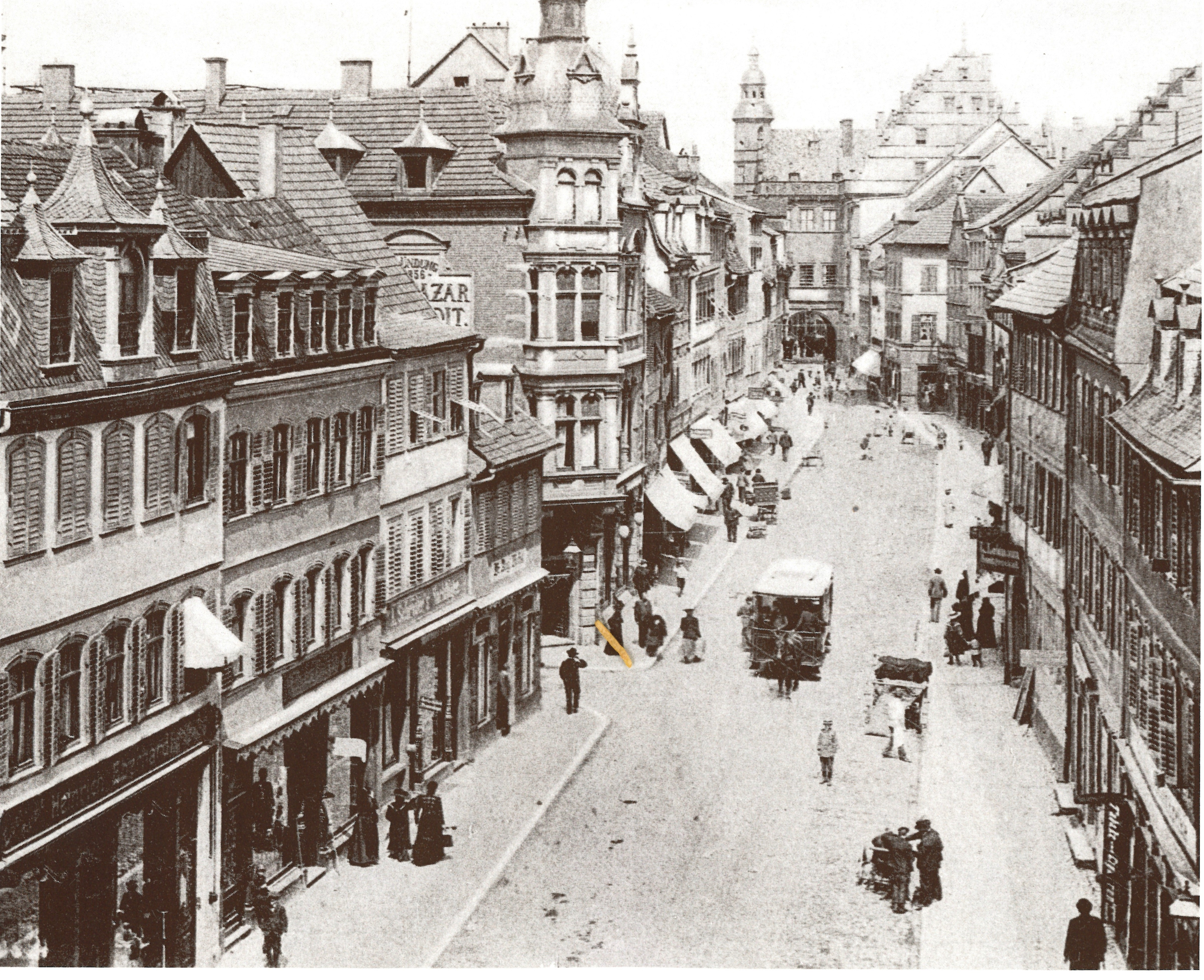
Spitalstraße after 1894 with tram

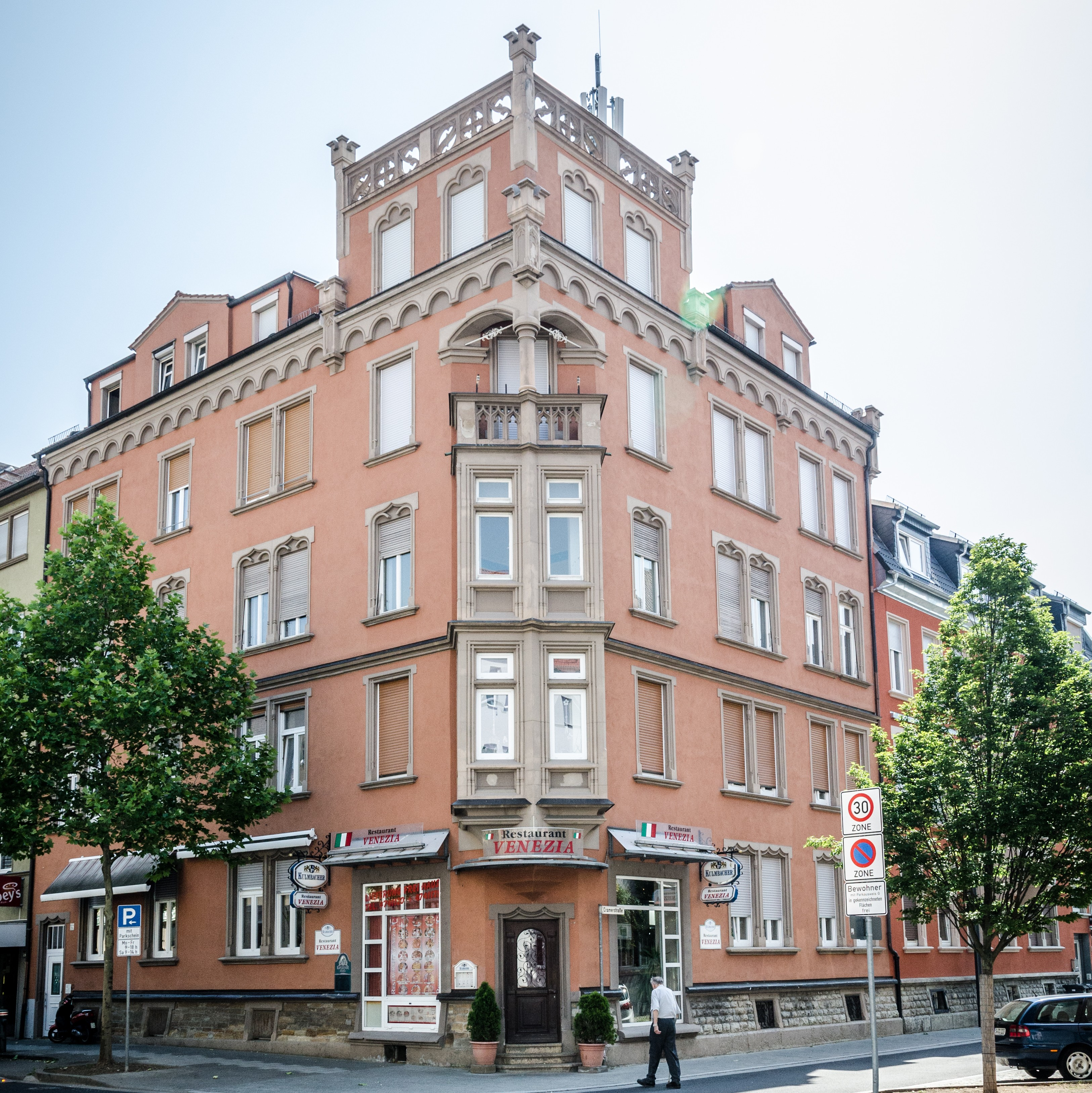
District of the Gründerzeit

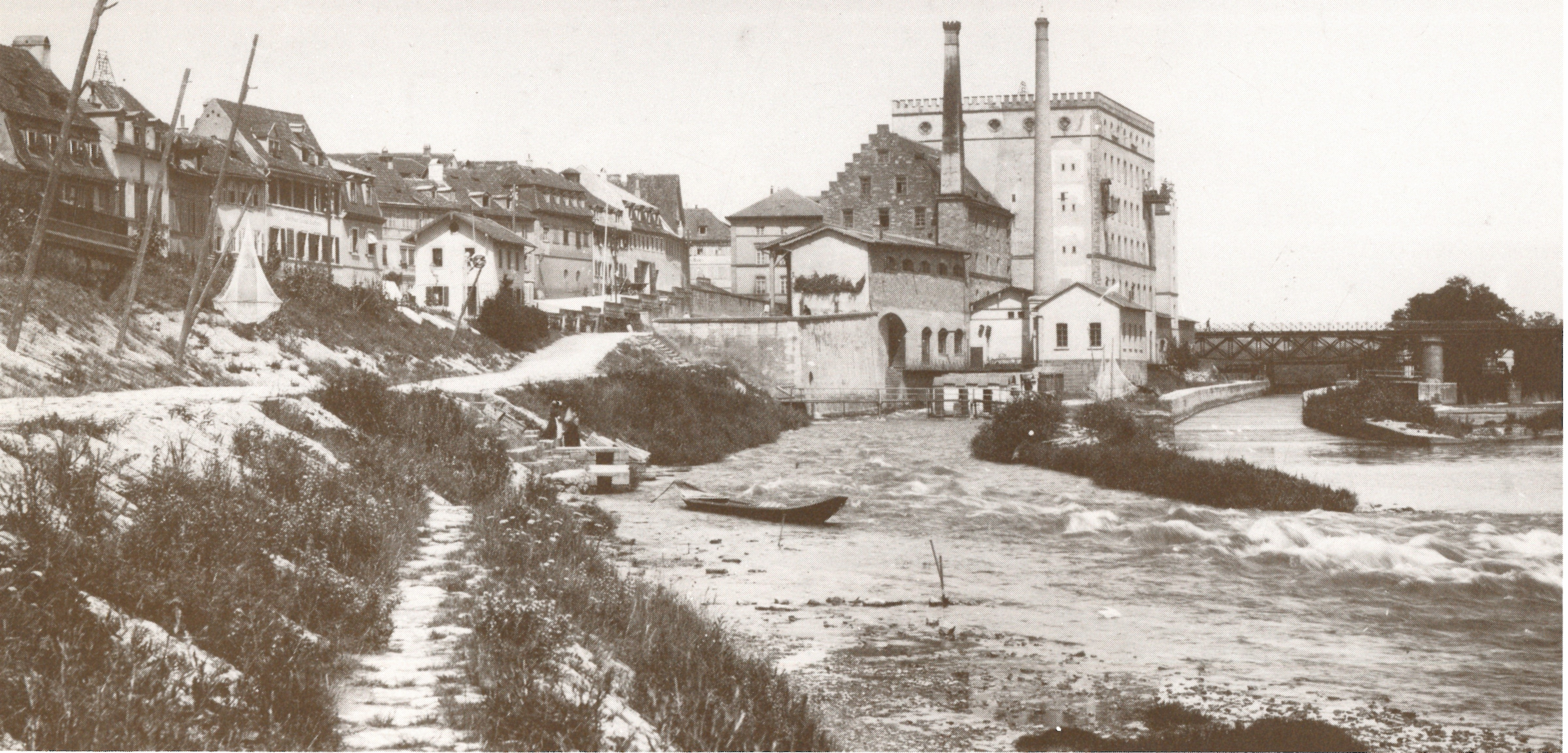
Main mills

Unlike many other cities, the 1930s were one of the most important epochs of urban development in Schweinfurt. The number of employees of major metalworking companies rose to 20,700 by 1939. This led to a construction boom and set the course for modern urban development.

=== World War II ===
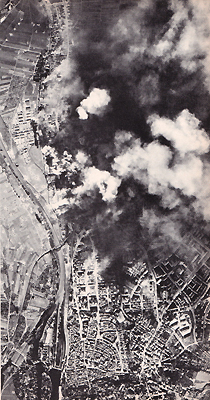
A USAAF raid on ball-bearing works in Schweinfurt in 1943

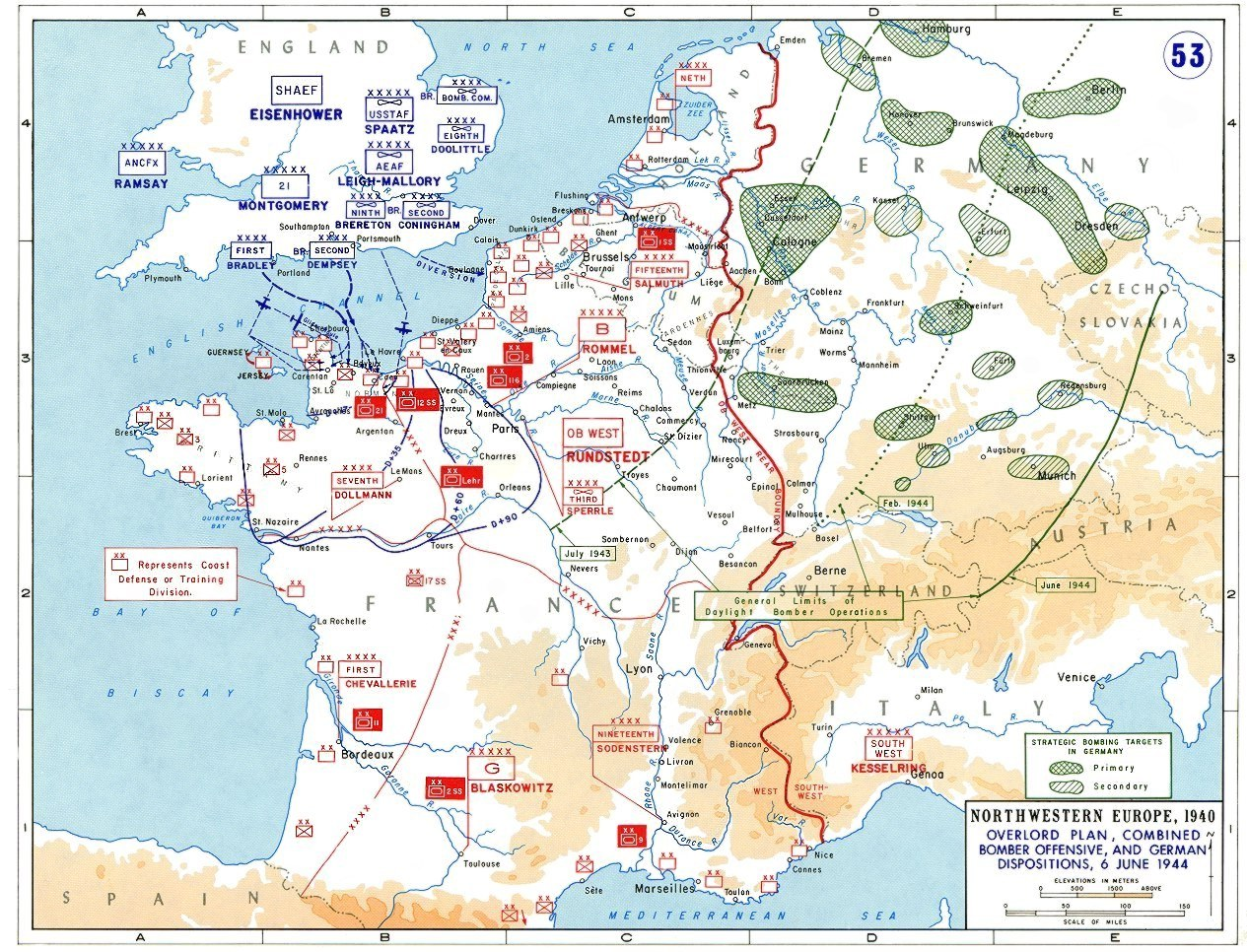
Operation Overlord with combined bomber offensive June 1944: Schweinfurt (checkered hatching in the German centre) was the only primary target of the Allies in Bavaria.

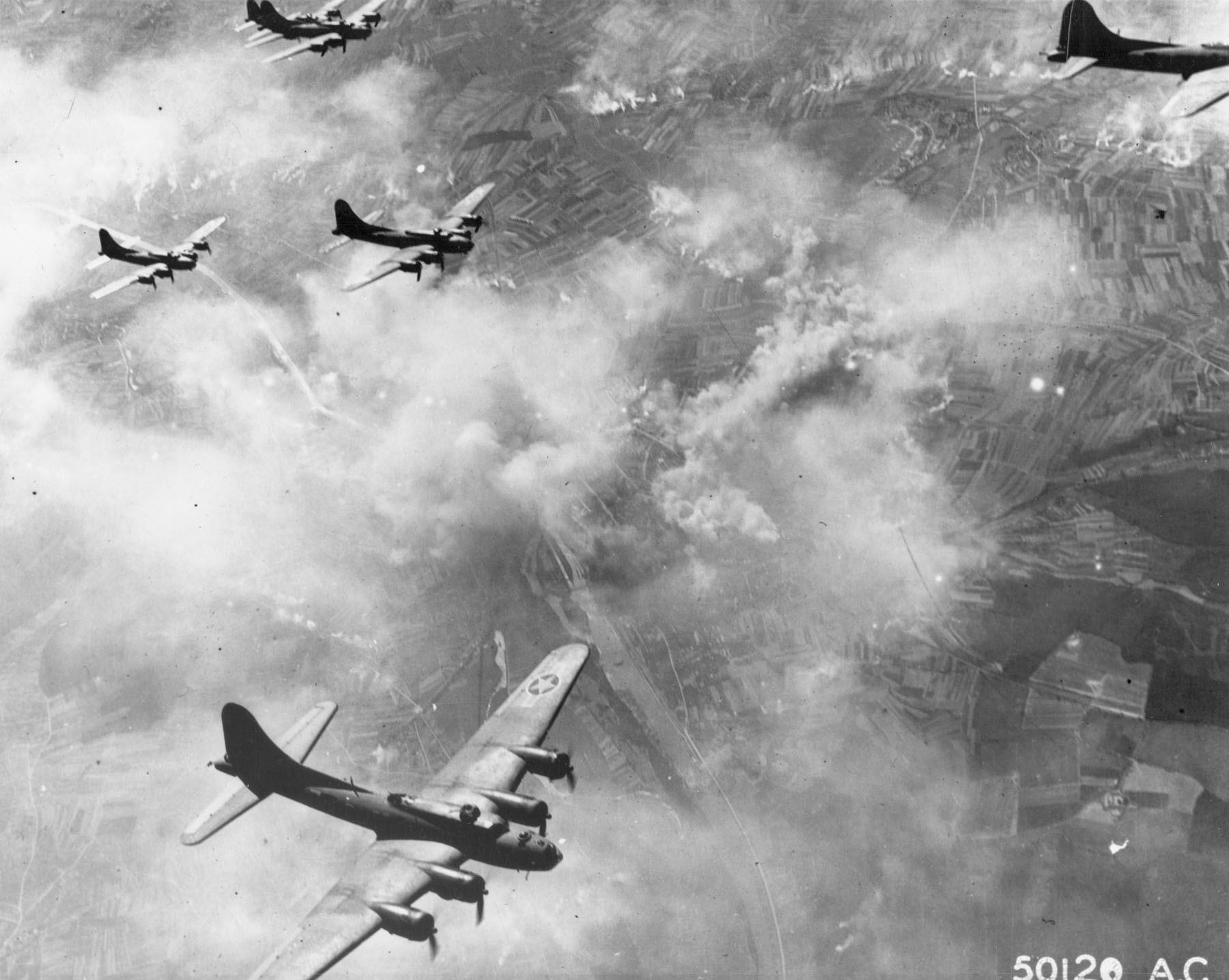
First attack on Schweinfurt with Boeing B-17 formation, 17 August 1943

In 1939, Schweinfurt produced most of Nazi Germany's ball bearings, and factories such as the Schweinfurter Kugellagerwerke became a target of Allied strategic bombing during World War II to cripple tank and aircraft production. Schweinfurt was bombed 22 times during Operation Pointblank by a total of 2,285 aircraft.

The Schweinfurt–Regensburg mission caused an immediate 34% loss of production and all plants but the largest were devastated by fire. Efforts to disperse the surviving machinery began immediately and the Luftwaffe deployed large numbers of interceptors along the corridor to Schweinfurt. Bombing also included the Second Raid on Schweinfurt on 14 October 1943 ("called Black Thursday because of the enormous loss of aircraft (60) and lives (600+)") and Big Week in February 1944.

Although losses of production bearings and machinery were high and much of the industrial and residential areas of the city were destroyed, killing more than a thousand civilians, the factories were restored to production and the industry dispersed. Although German planners initially thought it essential to purchase the entire output of the Swedish ball-bearing industry, losses in the production of bearings were actually made up from surpluses found within Germany in the aftermath of the first raid. The decentralized industry was able to restore output to 85% of its pre-bombing level. Hitler made restoration of ball bearing production a high priority and massive efforts were undertaken to repair and rebuild the factories, partly in bomb-proof underground facilities.

The 42nd Infantry Division (United States) entered Schweinfurt on 11 April 1945 and engaged in house-to-house fighting. On 12 April an internment camp at Goethe-Schule held male civilians aged 16–60.

=== U.S. Army Garrison Schweinfurt ===
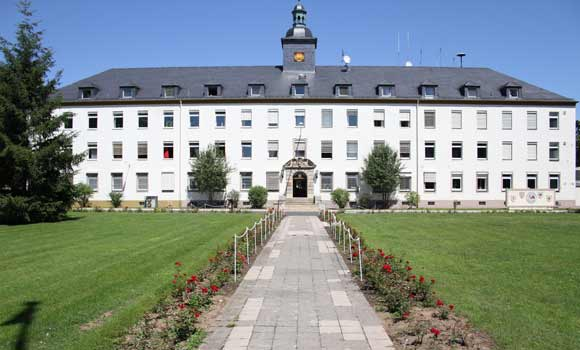
USAG Schweinfurt Ledward Barracks Headquarter Building

After the war Schweinfurt became a stronghold of the U.S. military and their dependents. Thus Schweinfurt recovered relatively quickly from its third period of destruction. The tank barracks renamed Ledward Barracks in 1946, became the headquarters of the newly founded U.S. Army Garrison Schweinfurt (USAG Schweinfurt). The U.S. Army took over the Luftwaffe Airfield as Schweinfurt Army Heliport and renamed the air base to Conn Barracks. In the course of time, until 2014, they were expanded into large barracks with many hangars, administration buildings, a large event hall, church and sports facilities.

From the 1950s to the late 1990s, a civilian infrastructure similar to that of a small American town was successively built in the northwest of Schweinfurt. As a result of the closure of many other German U.S. sites, Schweinfurt eventually became one of Europe's largest U.S. locations. Including the Brönnhof training area the USAG Schweinfurt covered a total area of 29 km^{2}. Schweinfurt formerly hosted the U.S. Army Garrison Schweinfurt, which the U.S. Army closed on 19 September 2014 due to an ongoing effort to concentrate the U.S. military's footprint in Germany to fewer communities.

=== Reconstruction and postwar period ===
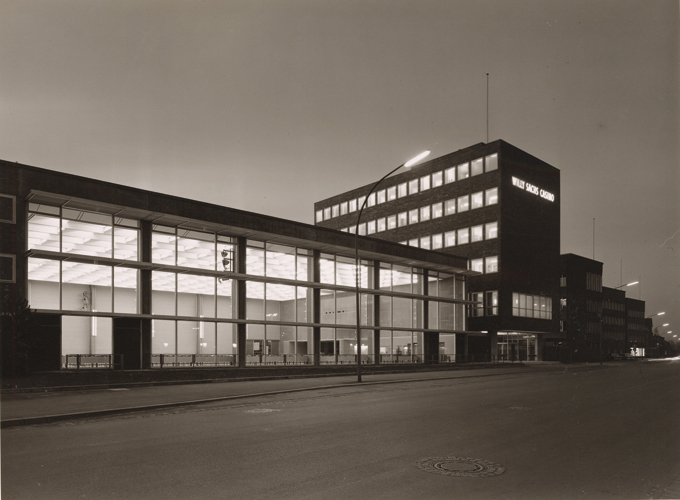
Ernst-Sachs-Straße in 1959

A quick, scheduled rebuilding of the city was not necessary due to the degree of destruction of 40 to 45% (see: Cityscape). Like many other West German cities and communities, Schweinfurt also experienced an unprecedented economic miracle in the 1950s and 1960s, and large-scale industry boomed. To counteract the labor shortage, guest workers were recruited from 1960 onwards.

Most of the postwar construction projects were realized under the aegis of Mayor Georg Wichtermann (SPD, 1965–1974), in the city governed by the SPD by an absolute majority. Numerous new residential districts were created. By the Jump over the River Main (starting from 1963) developed south of the Main River the commercial park Port East and the new industrial area Port West. The infrastructure was expanded, with the Main Port (1963) and today's University of Applied Sciences Würzburg-Schweinfurt (1971).

After successful reconstruction and the boom years, the time of Mayor Kurt Petzold (SPD, 1974–1992) was marked by consolidation, but also by the oil crisis and recessions, with job cuts in the local large-scale industry. The old town renovation began in 1979, as the starting point of a 40-year-long transformation of the city that has continued to this day, with a change in image, from the gray mouse industrial city to a city with a high quality of life. In 1991, the large Leopoldina Hospital was opened.

=== The era Grieser 1992–2010 ===
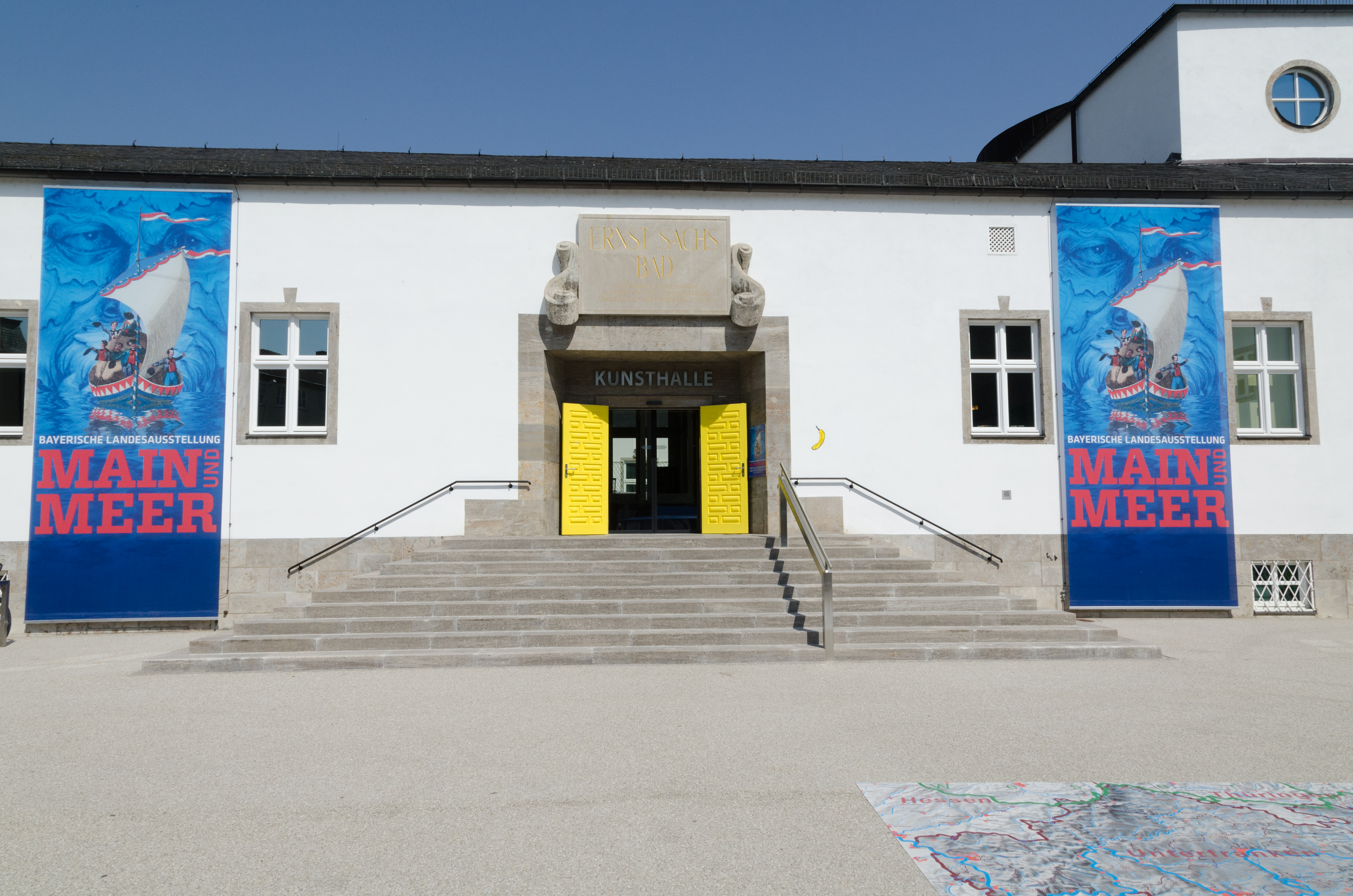
Kunsthalle (art gallery, 1933/2009)

In the city dominated by the SPD, the CSU succeeded in 1992 for the first time to make the Lord Mayor, with the political cross-starter Gudrun Grieser. The Bavarian state government under the then Prime Minister Edmund Stoiber (CSU) sympathetically accompanied the historical change of power and parts of the Bavarian State Social Court and the Bavarian State Statistics Office were relocated from Munich to Schweinfurt. During Grieser's term of office, the economic situation stabilized starting in the mid-1990s, with 4,500 new industrial jobs and around 6,000 jobs in the service sector. Trade tax revenue rose to a record high.

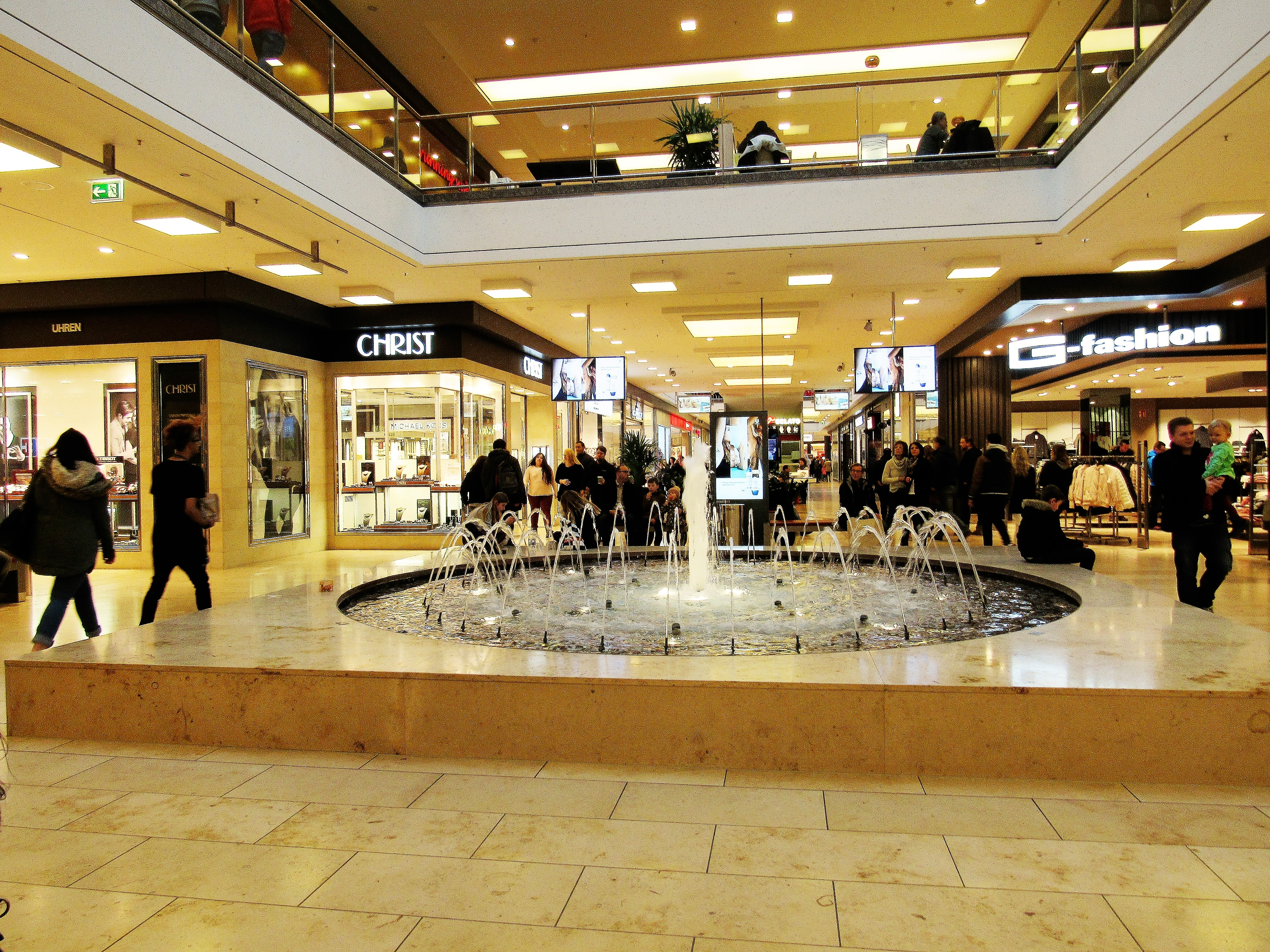
Stadtgalerie Schweinfurt, a 300 m long shopping mall (2009)

In the Grieser era, the city's new motto, Industry and Art, was developed. A large number of projects, in cooperation with the construction officer Jochen Müller (SPD) gave the city a new face, set new, nationally recognized symbols in architecture and were honored with numerous architecture prizes. Among the many realized projects are the new Industrial Park Gewerbepark Maintal (since 1995), the Museum Georg Schäfer (2000), the Maininsel Conference Center (2004), the Stadtbücherei Ebracher Hof (2007), the Kunsthalle Schweinfurt (art gallery, 2009), the Stadtgalerie Schweinfurt, a 300 m-long (980 ft) shopping mall 2009) with redesign of the Weststadt (westend) and the new Schweinfurt Mitte station, the Youth Hostel (2009), the Health Park Schweinfurt (2009) and the Campus 2 of the University of Applied Sciences Würzburg-Schweinfurt. The era of Grieser remains to this day shaping the city, like no other epoch after the reconstruction and it changed the city's image lasting positive.

In 1998, German and American veterans and survivors of the bombing raids came together to erect a war memorial to the fallen. 2004 startet the Unterfrankenshuttle (Lower Franconia Shuttle) of the Erfurter Bahn (EB) regional railway with lines from Schweinfurt to other parts of Lower Franconia and to South Thuringia.

=== Present ===
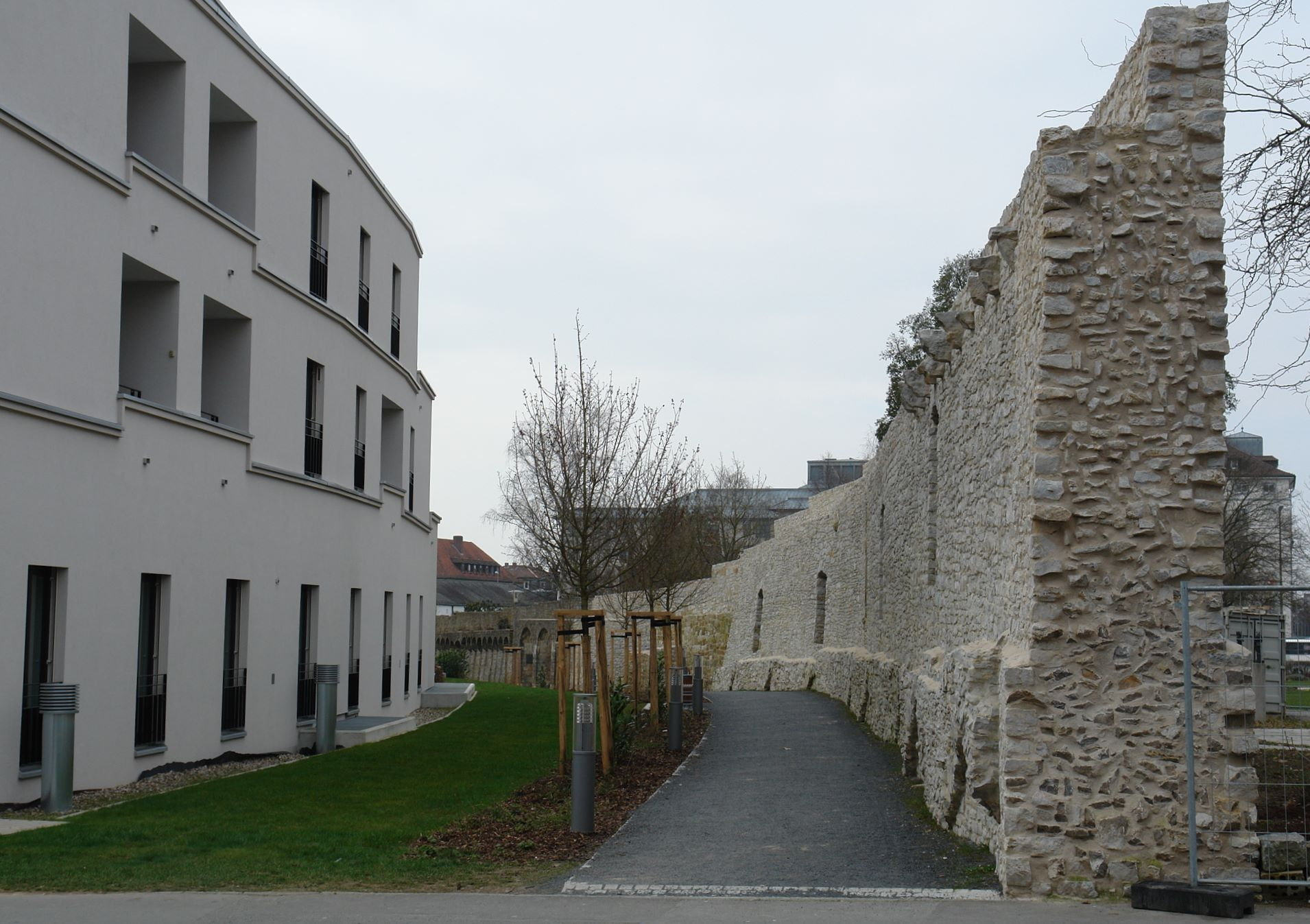
New Hadergasse Project (2014) on the city wall at the former Neutor

The New Hadergasse Project was implemented under the mayor Sebastian Remelé (CSU, since 2010). Trade tax receipts continued to rise and the city was able to save reserves. These are currently being used for the mammoth U.S. conversion project, which is currently one of the five largest military conversion projects in Germany. The i-Campus Schweinfurt in the former Ledward Barracks and the new district of Bellevue in the former Askren Manor Housing Area deserve special mention.

== Geography ==
=== Location ===
Schweinfurt has a central location in Germany and is located about 40 km from Baden-Württemberg, Hesse and Thuringia, in the middle of Main Franconia, Germanic-speaking Europe and the European Union. Schweinfurt lies on the river Main, which connects the North Sea with the Black Sea via the Rhine-Main-Danube Canal. While not being part of any metropolitan area, the city is situated between the cities of Frankfurt (110 km west) and Nuremberg (90 km southeast).

Schweinfurt also has a natural location in the Franconian wine country, at the Schweinfurter Rhön, with the National Natural Heritage Brönnhof and is surrounded by Haßberge Hills, Steigerwald, Rhön and Spessart, with several natural parks and a biosphere reserve. In sight are Steigerwald, Gramschatzer Forest and Rhön. The city is located in a climatically contrasting region, between the summer hot Mainfränkischen Plates in the south and the low mountain range in the north, with international winter sports in Oberhof.

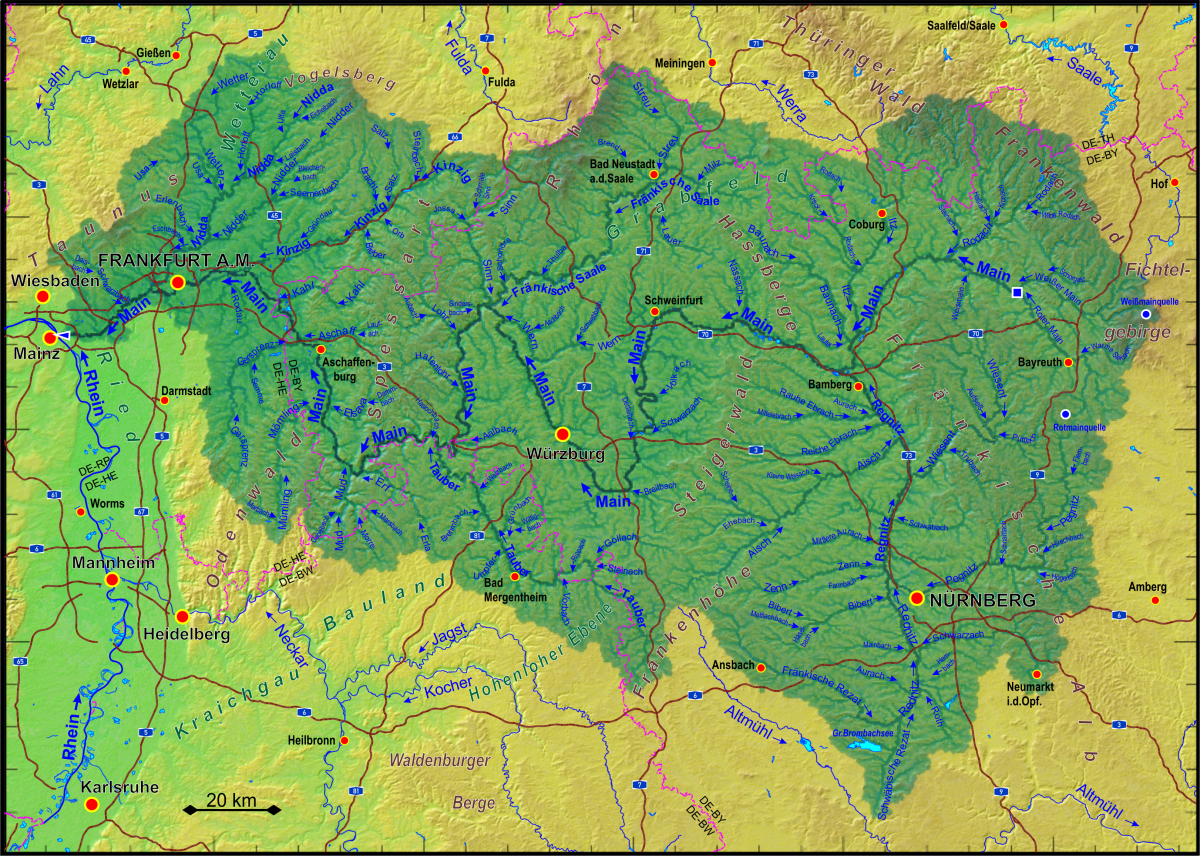
Schweinfurt is situated in the middle
of the catchment area
of the river Main ...

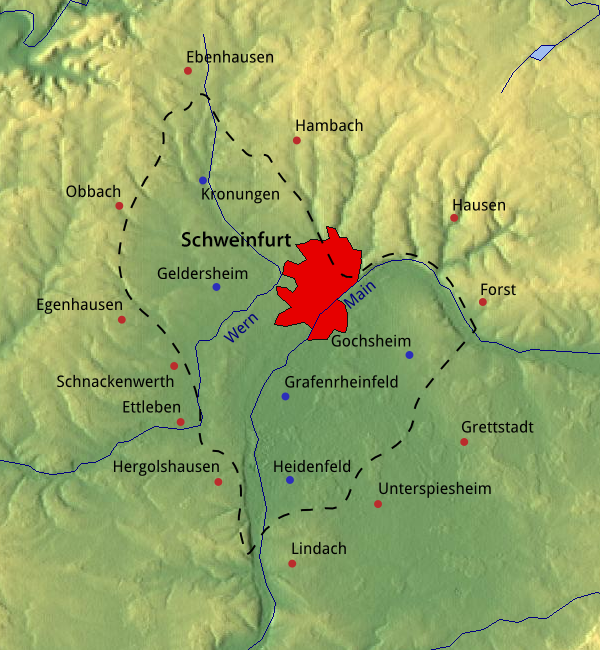
... and on the northeastern edge of the Schweinfurt Basin.

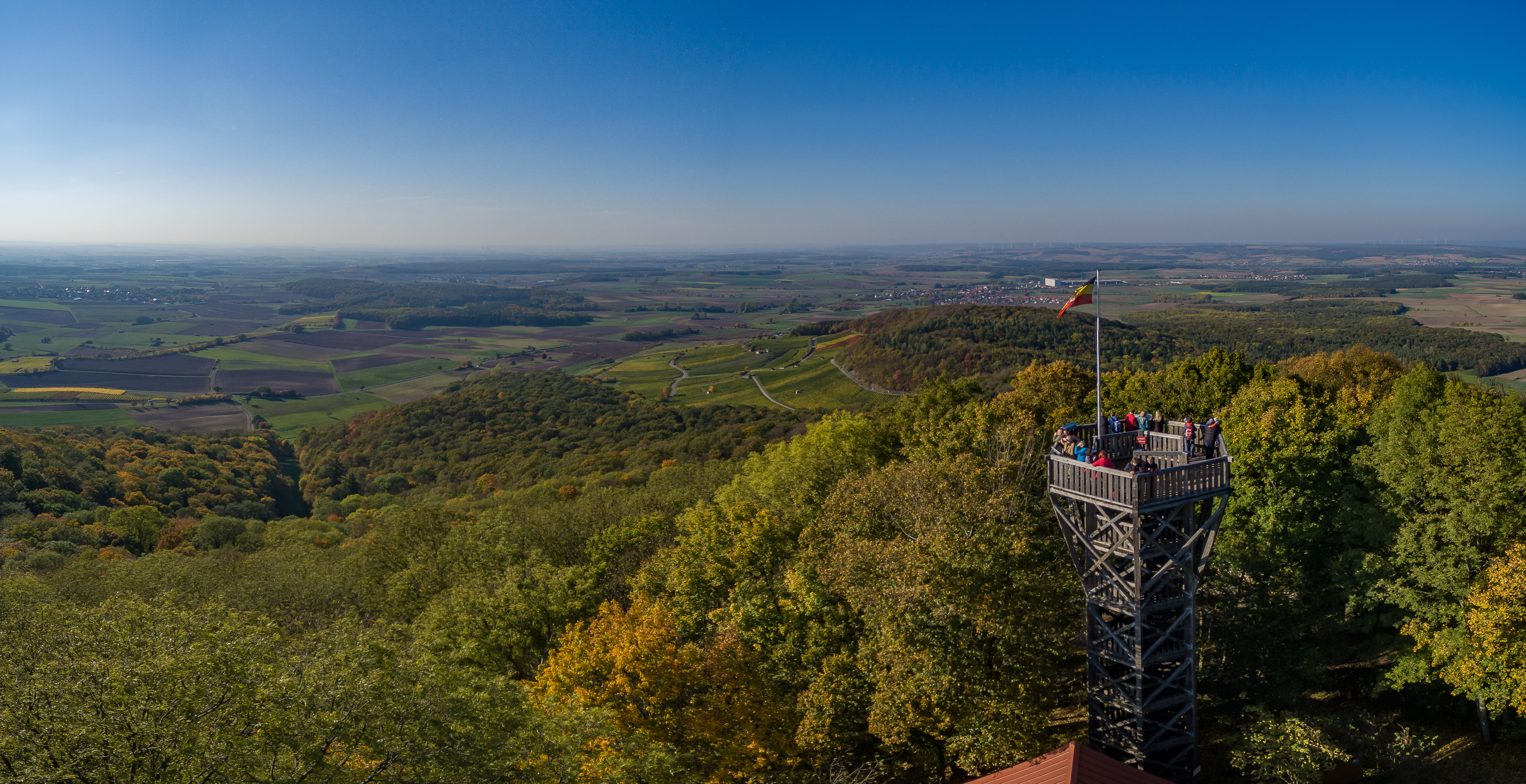
View from the Zabelstein Mountain in the Steigerwald
over the Schweinfurt Basin

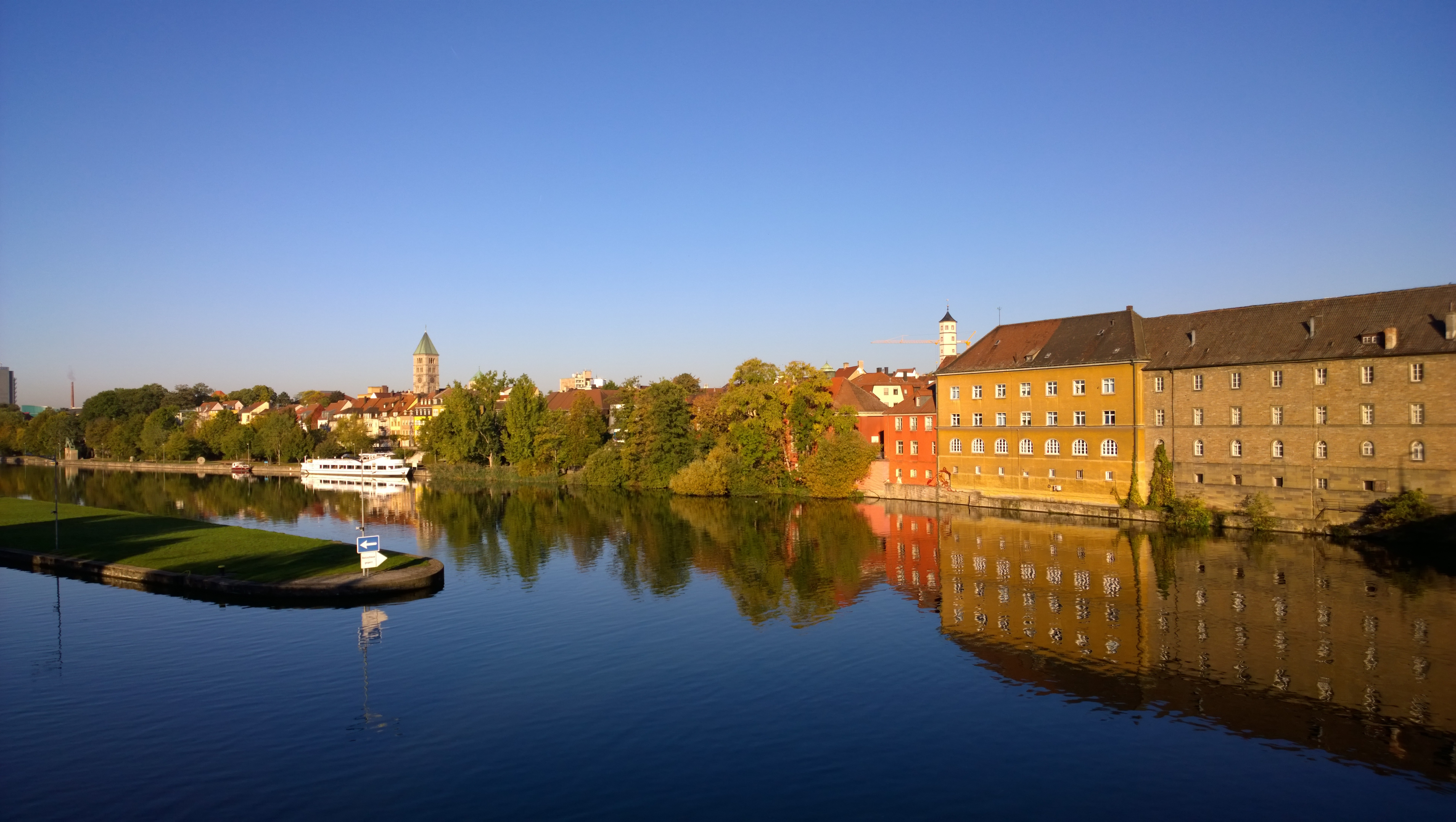
River Main with old mills (right), old town
and the old fishing district Fischerrain (left)

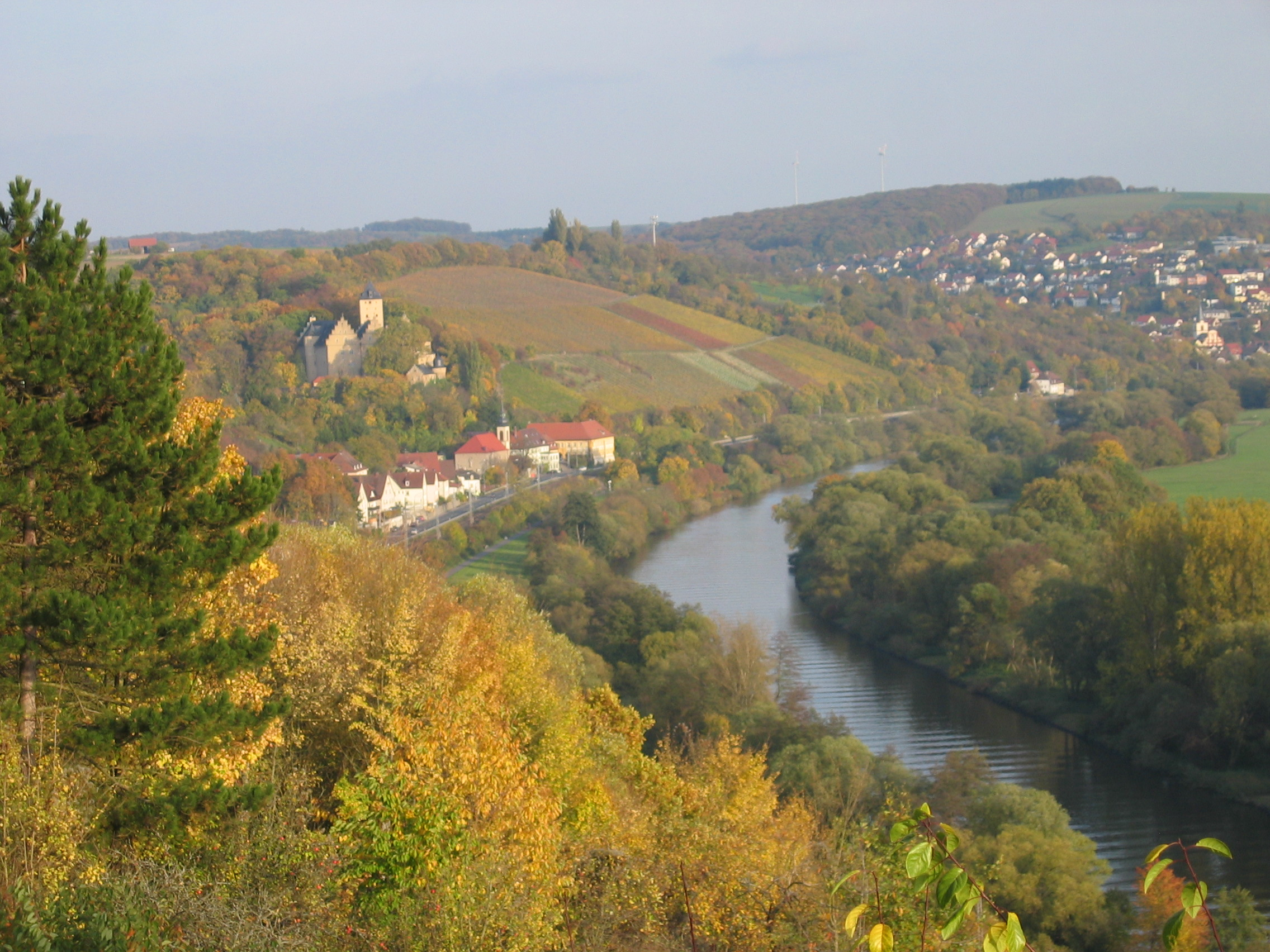
The Schweinfurt Main Bend
with village and castle Mainberg
and vineyards

Schweinfurt itself is also a city of great contrasts, in terms of topography, use and population structure. The bourgeois east lies on the foothills of the Schweinfurter Rhön, is intersected by valleys with streams, with the above the Marienbach located old town and numerous detached houses, on the edge with vineyards and the city forest. The west, with the city centre, main station and (former) working-class neighborhoods, has a high proportion of migrants. The almost uninhabited south is the largest contiguous industrial area in Bavaria.

=== New centrality ===
As a result of the fall of the Iron Curtain, the economic and geographical situation of Schweinfurt changed fundamentally. In 2005, the Thuringian Forest Autobahn 71 Erfurt-Schweinfurt was completed as a transport Project German Unity No. 16. In 2017 Schweinfurt gained further centrality with the 10 billion Euro transport Project German Unity No. 8. Berlin is now under three and a half hours, Munich from 2:33 hours and Hamburg from 3:57 hours reachable, now two high-speed lines, with change in Bamberg and Würzburg. Berlin and Munich are about three-quarters of an hour faster from Schweinfurt than from Frankfurt. Paris is in 6:22 hours reachable. As part of the Deutsche Bahn Long-Distance Transport Offensive Schweinfurt receives no later than December 2028 a direct Inter City (IC) connection, through the new IC Bamberg-Stuttgart-Tübingen.

=== Viticulture ===
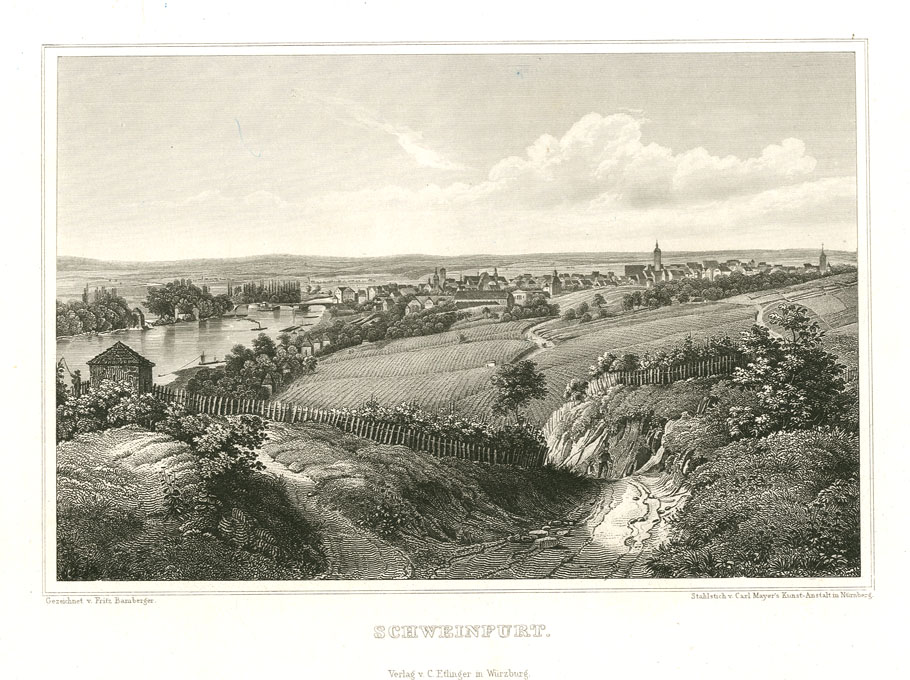
Schweinfurt's east side with vineyards. Steel engraving from 1847

Viticulture has probably been practiced in the city for well over 1000 years. At the beginning of the 19th century, Schweinfurt was an important Franconian wine-growing and wine-trading town. At the end of the imperial city period in 1802 there were around 320 hectares of vines, which corresponds to today's largest Franconian wine-growing town in Nordheim am Main. Large parts of today's district, right up to the edge of the old town, are located on former vineyards. Goethe appreciated the Schweinfurt wine and had large quantities delivered. Today, with only 3.54 hectares of vineyards (2017), the local viticulture has hardly any economic, but still cultural importance for the self-awareness and way of life of the city.

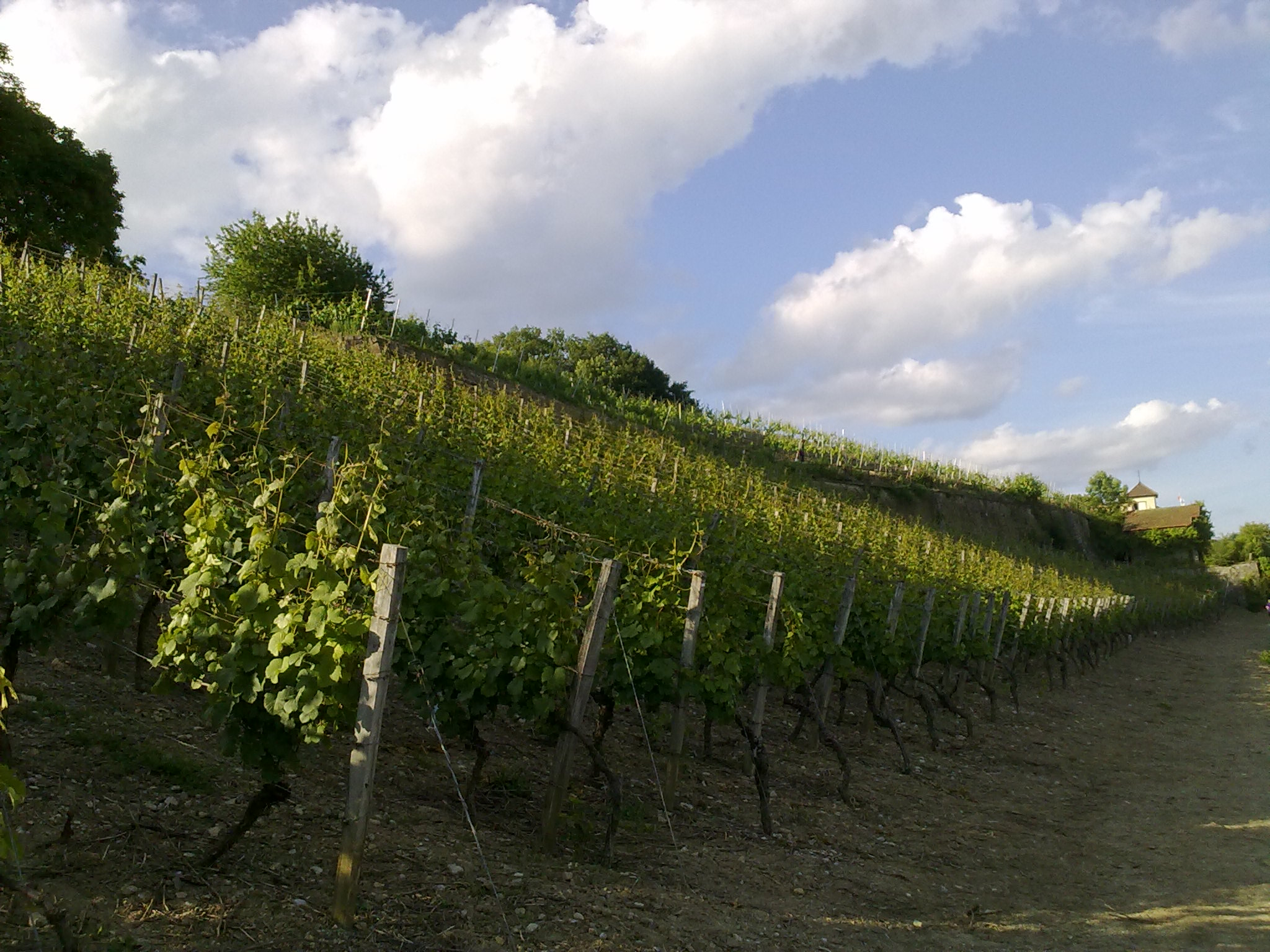
Vineyard Schweinfurter Peterstirn

The phylloxera appeared in Franconia in 1902 and hit the Schweinfurt area particularly hard. Since the 1980s, viticulture with the leading variety Silvaner has been carried out as planned in the historic wine locations of Peterstirn and Mainleite. Due to the almost complete interruption of winegrowing, the vineyards were spared the major land consolidation of the 1970s, during which the historical structures were mostly destroyed. The small wine-cultural landscape at Peterstirn Palace remained intact. There is a family-owned winery on Peterstirn, where a wine festival takes place twice a year.

=== Districts ===
In the Bavarian territorial reform no suburbs were incorporated into the city of Schweinfurt, which is why the urban area includes only the core city and incorporated in 1919 Oberndorf. The urban area was divided into 23 statistical districts, which are summarized in 15 districts (bold font in the table). For a long time, the Bergl was the most populous district, with 13,000 inhabitants around 1970. With only 9,163 inhabitants at the end of 2017, it was only second, after the city centre, with 11,276 inhabitants.

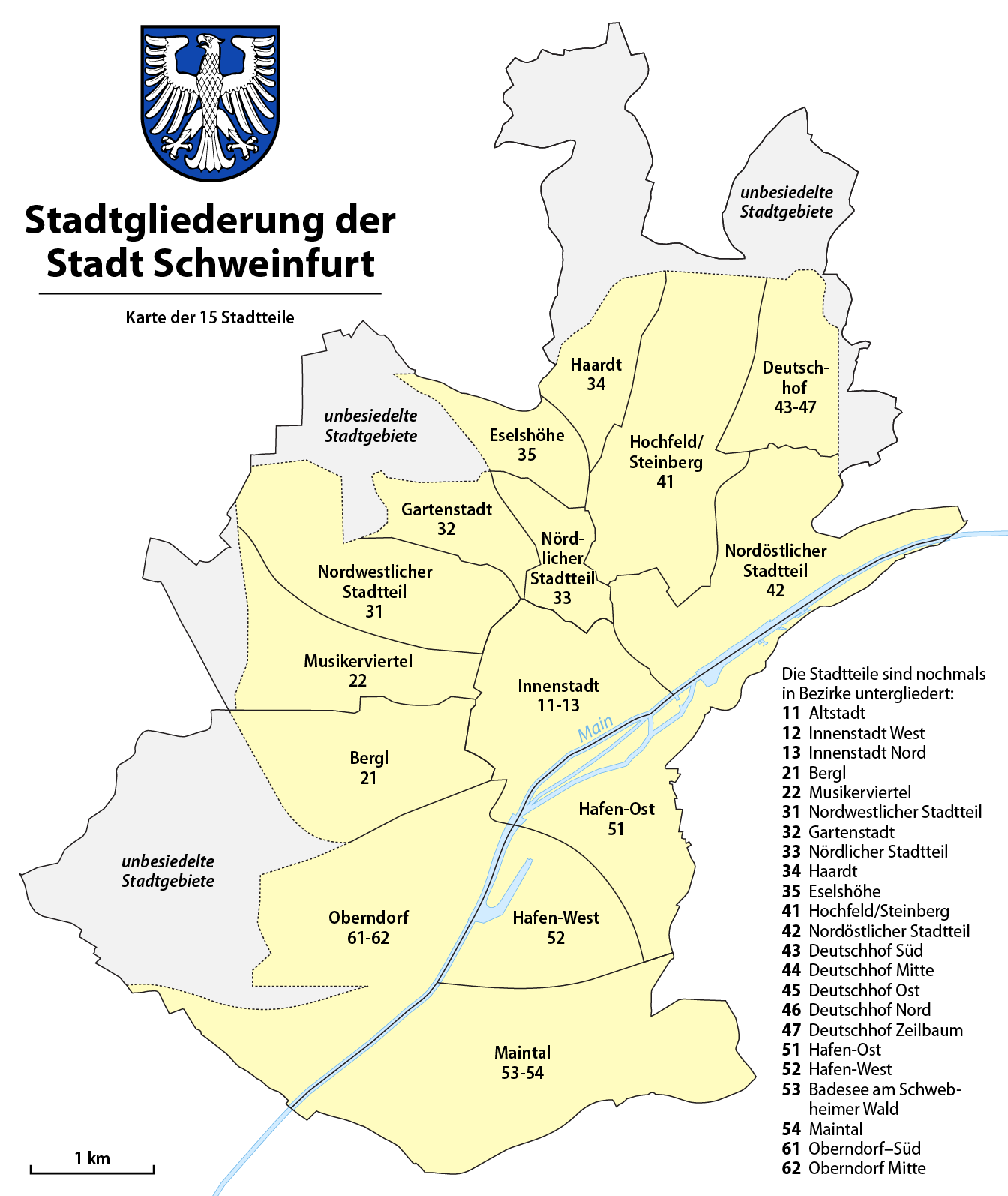
Districts of the city of Schweinfurt

Urban structure and social structure
No.	District	Inhabitants 31 December 2015	Foreigners (%)	Dual citizens (%)
11	Old Town	2,529	17.7	6.9
12	City West	4,291	29.4	15.7
13	City-Nord	3,994	23.0	13.1
21	Bergl	9,162	18.8	23.9
22	Musikerviertel	3,103	20.4	20.1
31	Northwest District	3,314	19.1	15.5
32	Gartenstadt	2,787	6.6	9.4
33	North District	3,024	11.9	16.6
34	Haardt	1,779	7.4	17.4
35	Eselshöhe	2,561	4.3	13.9
41	Hochfeld/Steinberg	5,126	7.6	10.8
42	Northeast District	2,734	7.4	8.2
43	Deutschhof South	1,855	6.1	26.3
44	Deutschhof Centre	1,454	9.6	27.4
45	Deutschhof East	962	7.3	25.7
46	Deutschhof North	963	6.0	14.6
47	Deutschhof Zeilbaum	784	1.9	11.4
51	Port East	244	7.8	7.4
52	Port West	22	50.0	4.5
53	Badesee am Schwebheimer Wald	4	0.0	0.0
54	Maintal	2	0.0	0.0
61	Oberndorf South	1,135	11.3	9.7
62	Oberndorf Centre	1,326	16.1	13.7
	not to be assigned	47	2.1	25.5
	Schweinfurt in total	53,202	14.6	16.2

== Demographics ==
In 1939, Schweinfurt had about 49,000 inhabitants. The population reached its highest level in 1970 with 58,500 inhabitants. While thereafter most German cities could compensate for a demographic-related decrease of inhabitants by incorporations, in Schweinfurt the population decreased to about 52,000 in 1987. By 1996, the population rose to 56,000, mainly due to the influx of late repatriates. However, by 2014, the number of inhabitants fell again to 51,600 people, the lowest since the early 1950s. Thereafter, contrary to the forecasts of the Bavarian State Statistics Office and the Bertelsmann Foundation, both of which merely continued the past demographic development, a positive turnaround occurred due to several factors not taken into account: refugees, US conversion, i-Campus Schweinfurt. Since 2015, the number of inhabitants has been rising steadily, most recently to 54,032 at the end of 2018.

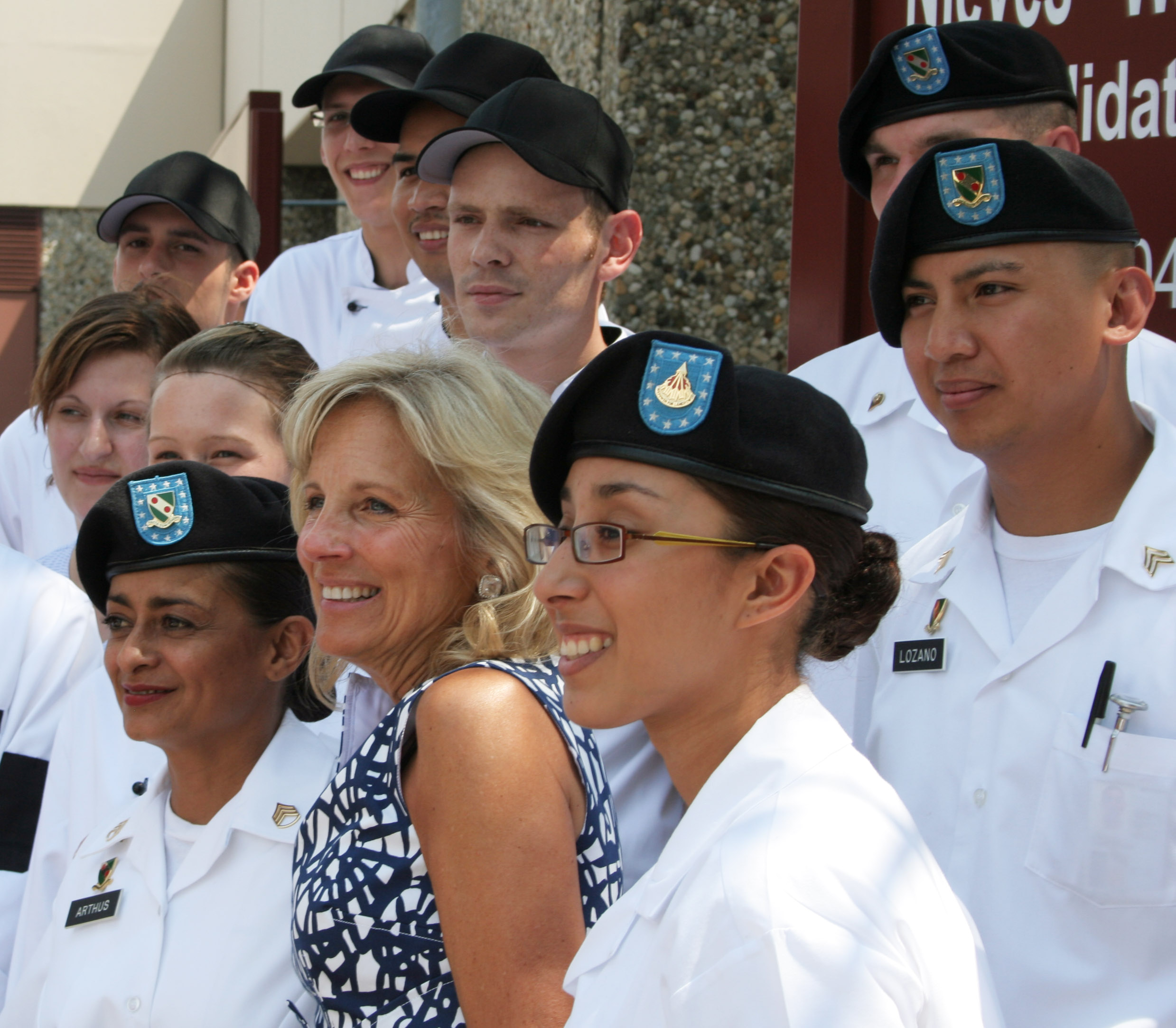
The last 12,000 American soldiers and civilians living in and around Schweinfurt (here at the 2009 American Independence Day) are not included in the official population statistics.

Not included in the population statistics are members of the U.S. Army Garrison Schweinfurt stationed in and near the city between 1945 and 2014 with their families. These were at times over 12,000 people.

The urban agglomeration is in the case of Schweinfurt a better comparison size to the population of other cities. In 1994, it had 105,000 inhabitants, fell to 96,600 inhabitants (Census 9. 5. 2011) and then rose again to 100,200 inhabitants (estimate 31. 12. 2018).

Historical population

Date	Pop.
1800	6.045 ¹
1 December 1840	7,766 ²
1 December 1871	10,840 ²
1 December 1900	17,401 ²
16 June 1925	36,336 ²
17 May 1939	49,302 ²
13 September 1950	46,128 ²
6 June 1961	56,923 ²
27 May 1970	**58,446** ²
25 May 1987	51,962 ²
31 December 1994	55,500 ³
31 December 1995	55,700 ³

Date	Pop.
31 December 1996	55,700 ³
31 December 1997	55,400 ³
31 December 1998	55,100 ³
31 December 1999	54,500 ³
31 December 2000	54,300 ³
31 December 2001	54,600 ³
31 December 2002	54,700 ³
31 December 2003	54,600 ³
31 December 2004	54,500 ³
31 December 2005	54,273 ³
31 December 2006	53,970 ³
31 December 2007	53,798 ³

Date	Pop.
31 December 2008	53,588 ³
31 December 2009	53,533 ³
31 December 2010	53,415 ³
31 December 2011	52,118 ³
31 December 2012	52,098 ³
31 December 2013	51,851 ³
31 December 2014	51,610 ³
31 December 2015	51,969 ³
31 December 2016	52,724 ³
31 December 2017	53,437 ³
31 December 2018	54,032 ³

Bold: highest level

Red: lowest since the early 1950s
¹ stating the town of Schweinfurt
² Census (official population)

³ Information of the Bavarian State Office for Statistics (official population)

== Economy ==
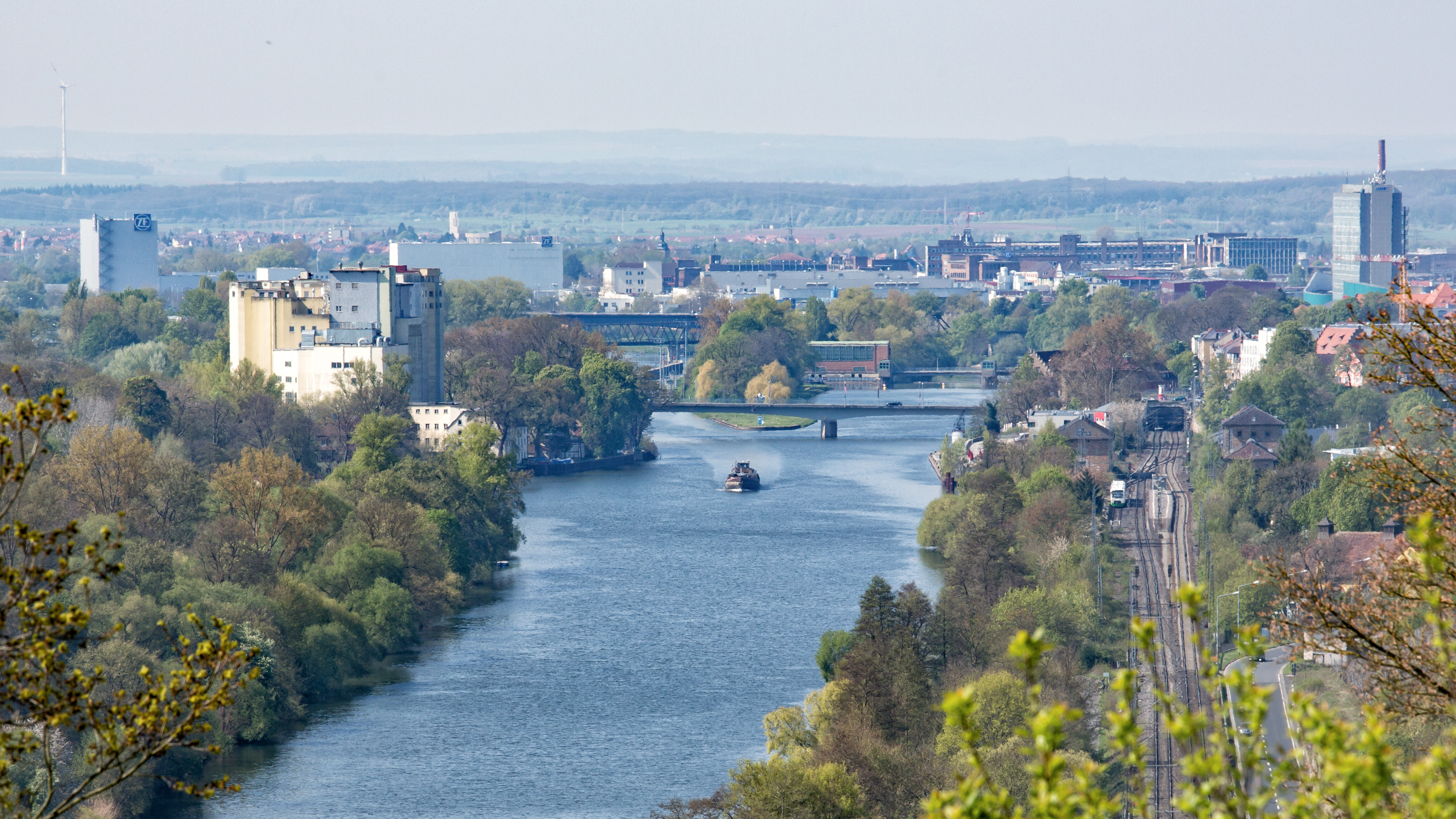
Harbor and industrial area on the Main

Schweinfurt is known for its metal industry, especially ball bearing plants, FAG Kugelfischer AG, ZF Sachs AG, Bosch Rexroth and SKF. The pigment Schweinfurt Green is manufactured here. SRAM Corporation hosts the world's largest development centre of the bicycle industry in Schweinfurt.

With a GDP per capita of €78,382, Schweinfurt ranks third in Germany after Wolfsburg and Frankfurt am Main.

According to a recent study by the Swiss Institute of Economic Research forecasters, Schweinfurt is one of the fastest-growing cities in Germany. The study confirmed the city, among other things, the highest concentration of jobs in Germany, with particularly high Beschäftigungsanteil (employment share) in the German high-tech sector.

The Contor-2010 study, which was commissioned by the Manager Magazine, ranked Schweinfurt as one of the most dynamic cities in Europe in terms of development opportunities. From rank 63 in 2007, the city significantly improved to rank 16 in 2010.

=== Notable companies ===
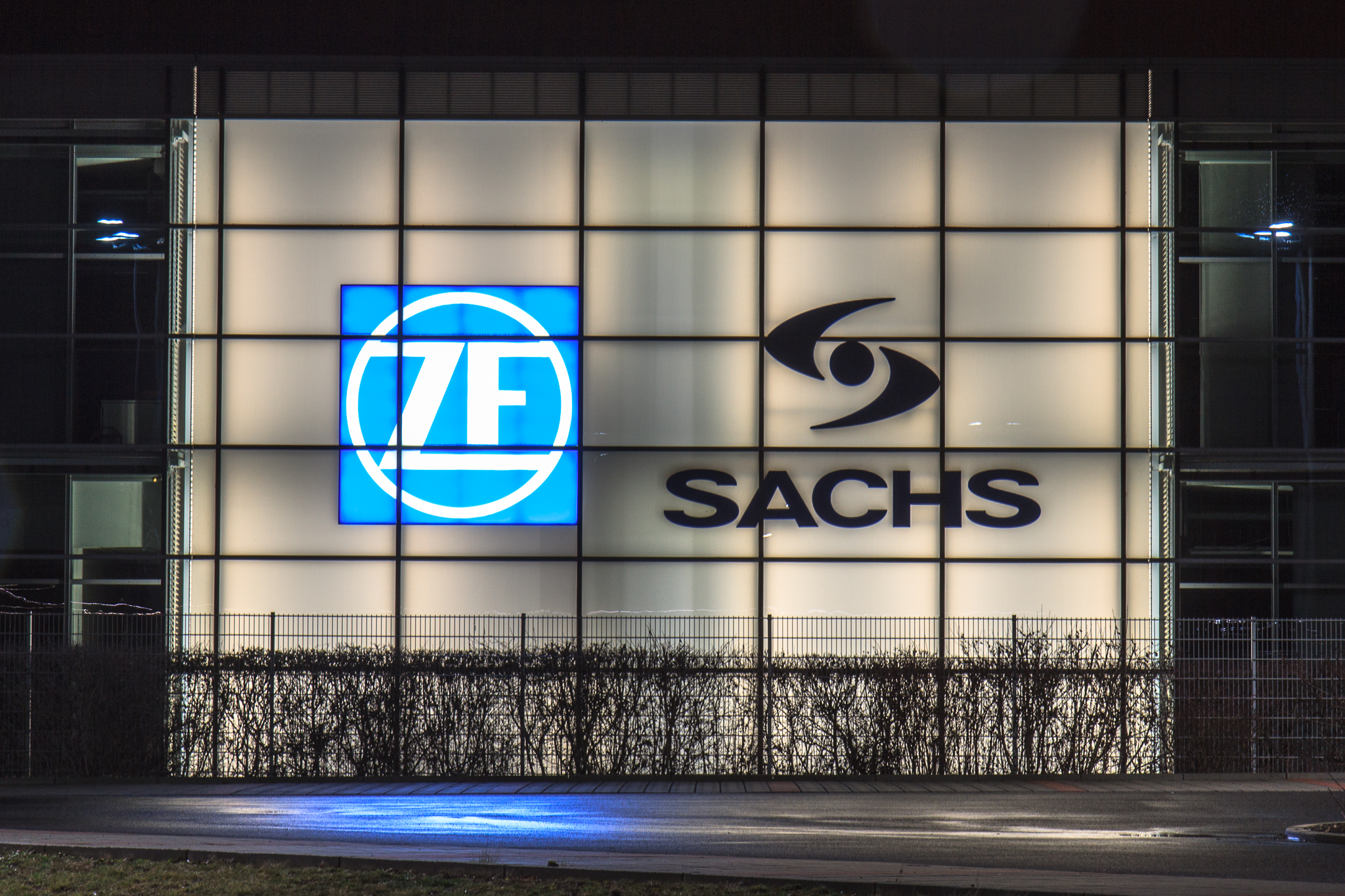
ZF Sachs, company name 2001–2011, before merger of both groups

- Bosch Rexroth, Linear Motion Technology Plant; Headquarters in Lohr am Main am Main
- Carl Kühne KG; one of the two largest German production sites is the Schweinfurt plant on the Sennfelder district, head office in Hamburg
- Fresenius Medical Care; The largest production and development location of the DAX Group is in Schweinfurt, head office in Bad Homburg
- Schaeffler Group (formerly DAX Group FAG Kugelfischer), the second largest rolling bearing group in the world, the largest manufacturing site in Schweinfurt, also the seat of the industry; Headquarters in Herzogenaurach
- Swedish ball bearing factories SKF, largest rolling bearing group in the world; largest plant worldwide is in Schweinfurt; Headquarters in Gothenburg
- SenerTec, European market leader for micro-cogeneration plants
- SRAM (formerly bicycle components by Fichtel & Sachs); European headquarters is in Schweinfurt; Headquarters in Chicago
- Winora Staiger, bicycles [150]
- ZF Friedrichshafen (formerly Fichtel & Sachs), the second largest automotive supplier in the world, the largest factory in the world is in Schweinfurt, also the headquarters of the E-Mobility; Headquarters in Friedrichshafen

== Communal facilities ==
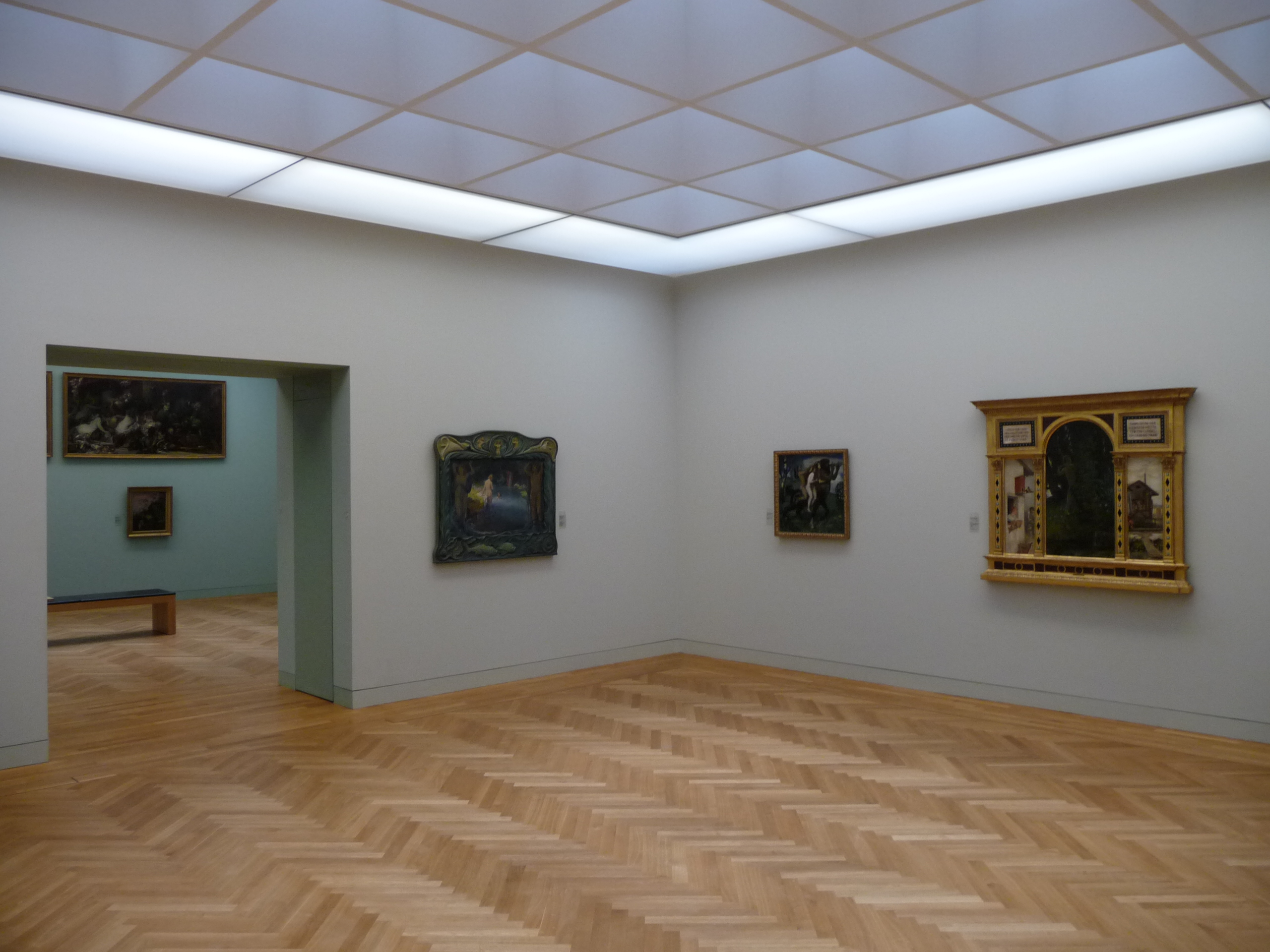
Museum Georg Schäfer, skylight rooms on the second floor

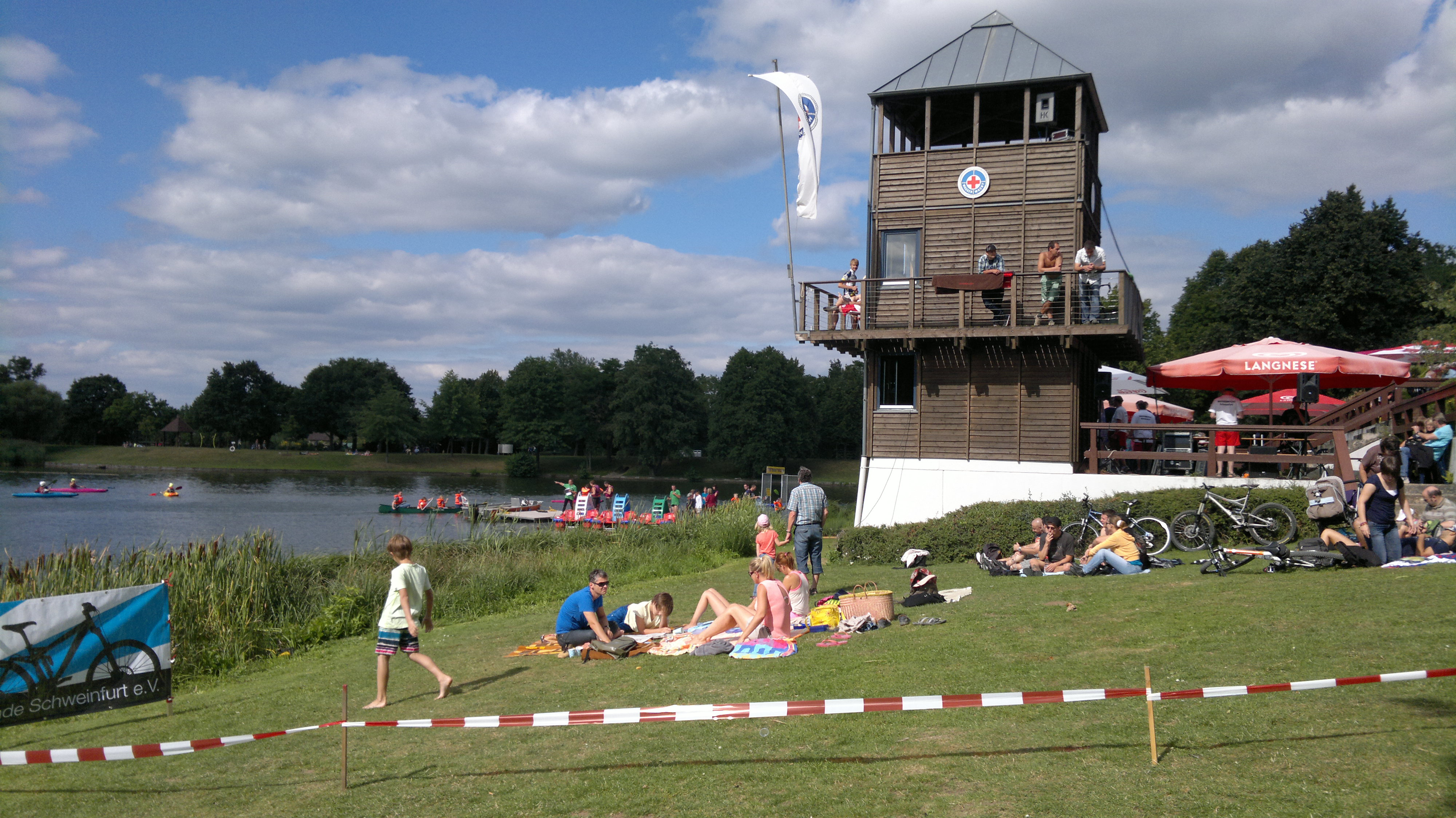
Bathing lake at the Schwebheim Forest, in the south of the city

- University of Applied Sciences Würzburg-Schweinfurt (Fachhochschule Würzburg-Schweinfurt FHWS) with the international i-Campus Schweinfurt. The FHWS offers also dual studies.
- Fraunhofer Institut für Produktionstechnik und Automatisierung IPA
- Academic teaching hospital
- Alexander-von-Humboldt-Gymnasium
- Many other academies, high schools, technical colleges, vocational and special schools
- School of music
- Libraries
- Museums
- Galleries
- Theatre
- Many parks
- Golf courses
- Rowing regatta stretch
- Swimming pool
- Indoor swimming pool
- Swimming lake
- City beach
- Waterfronts

== Transport ==
=== Air ===
The nearest airports are Nuremberg Airport, located 117 km (73 mi) south east and Frankfurt Airport, located 164 km (102 mi) west of Schweinfurt.

== Culture and architecture ==
=== Cityscape ===
Schweinfurt has a contrasting cityscape with old and modern buildings.

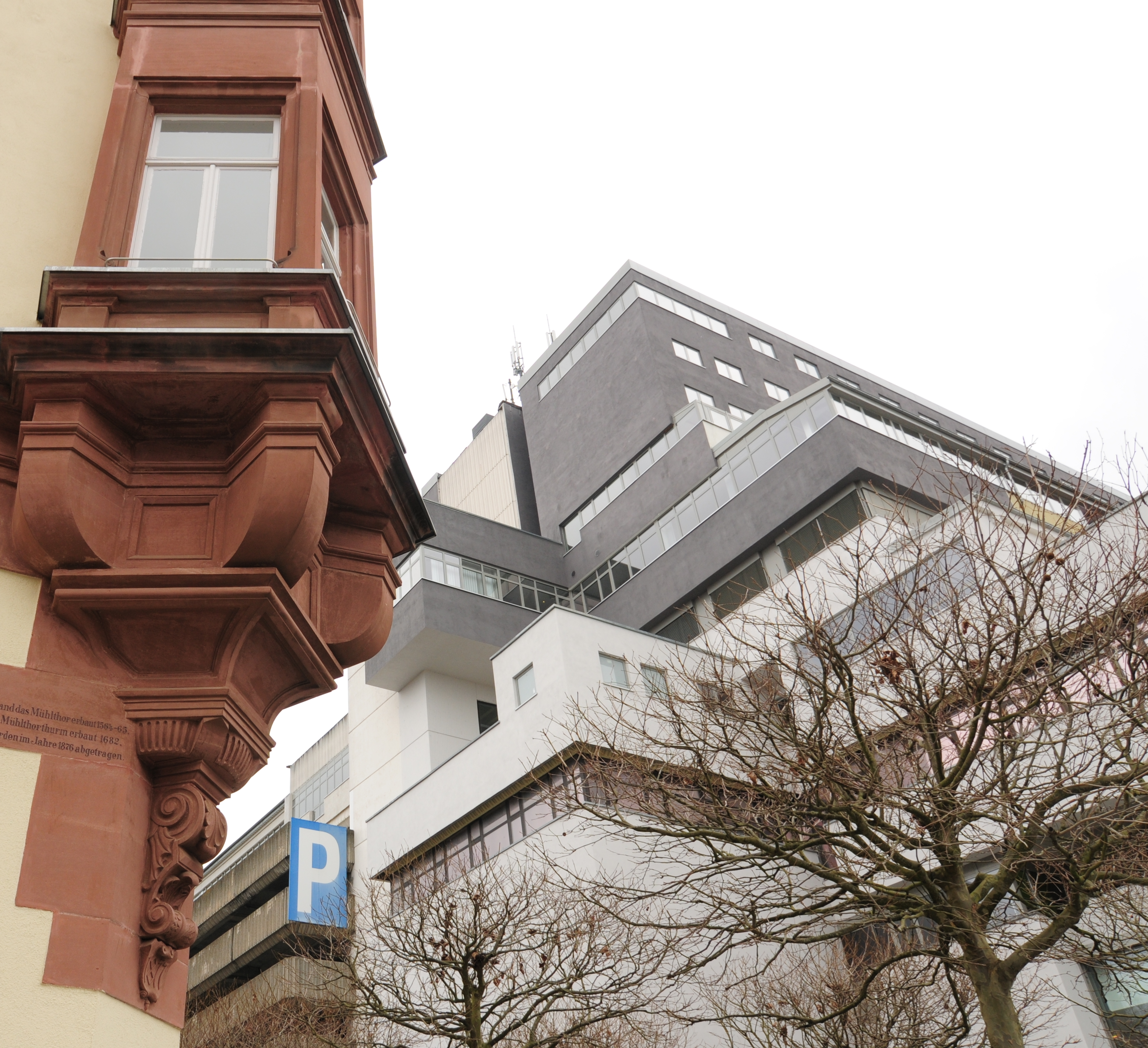
Rückert Center
and Old Reichsbank

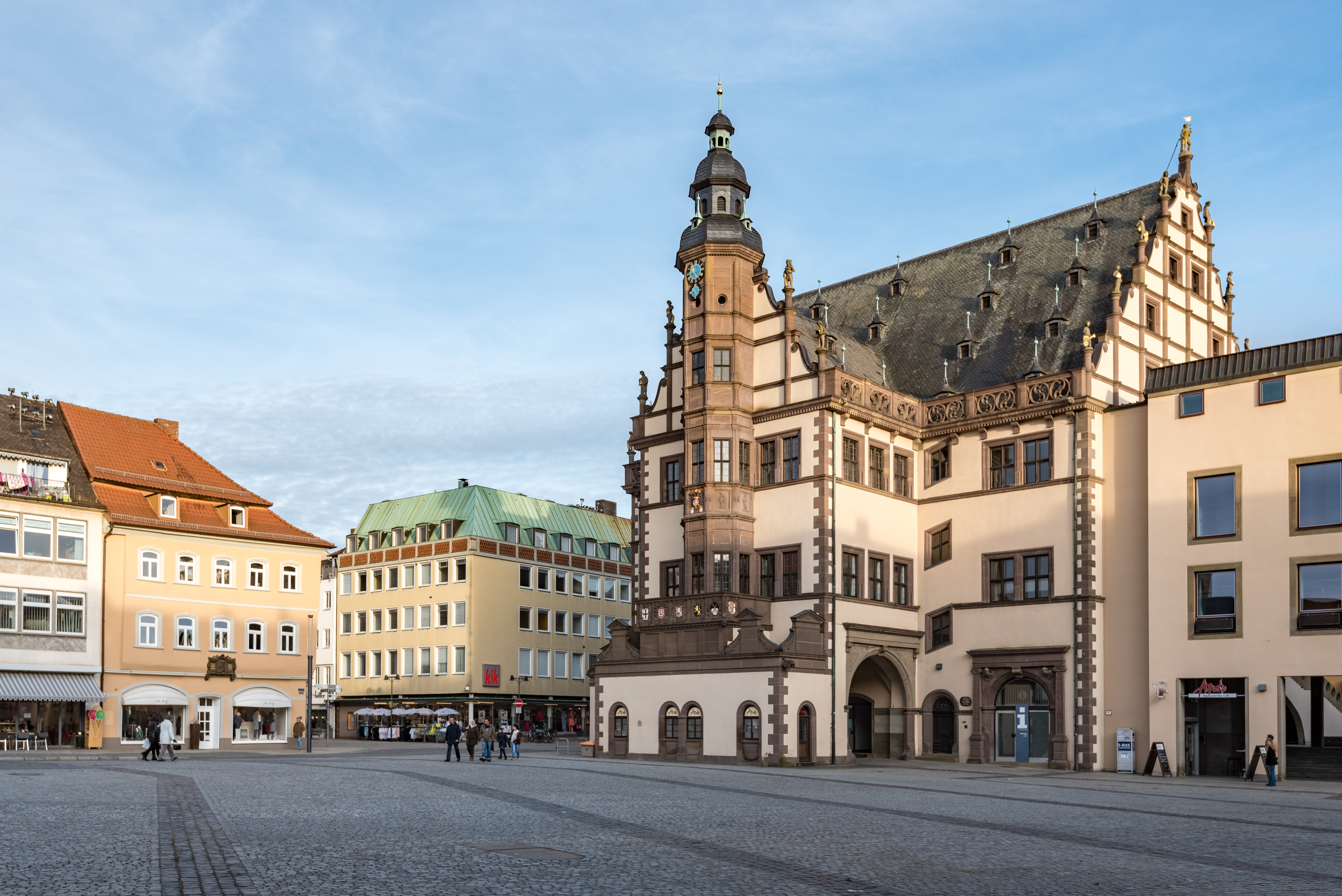
Marketplace with the Old Town Hall

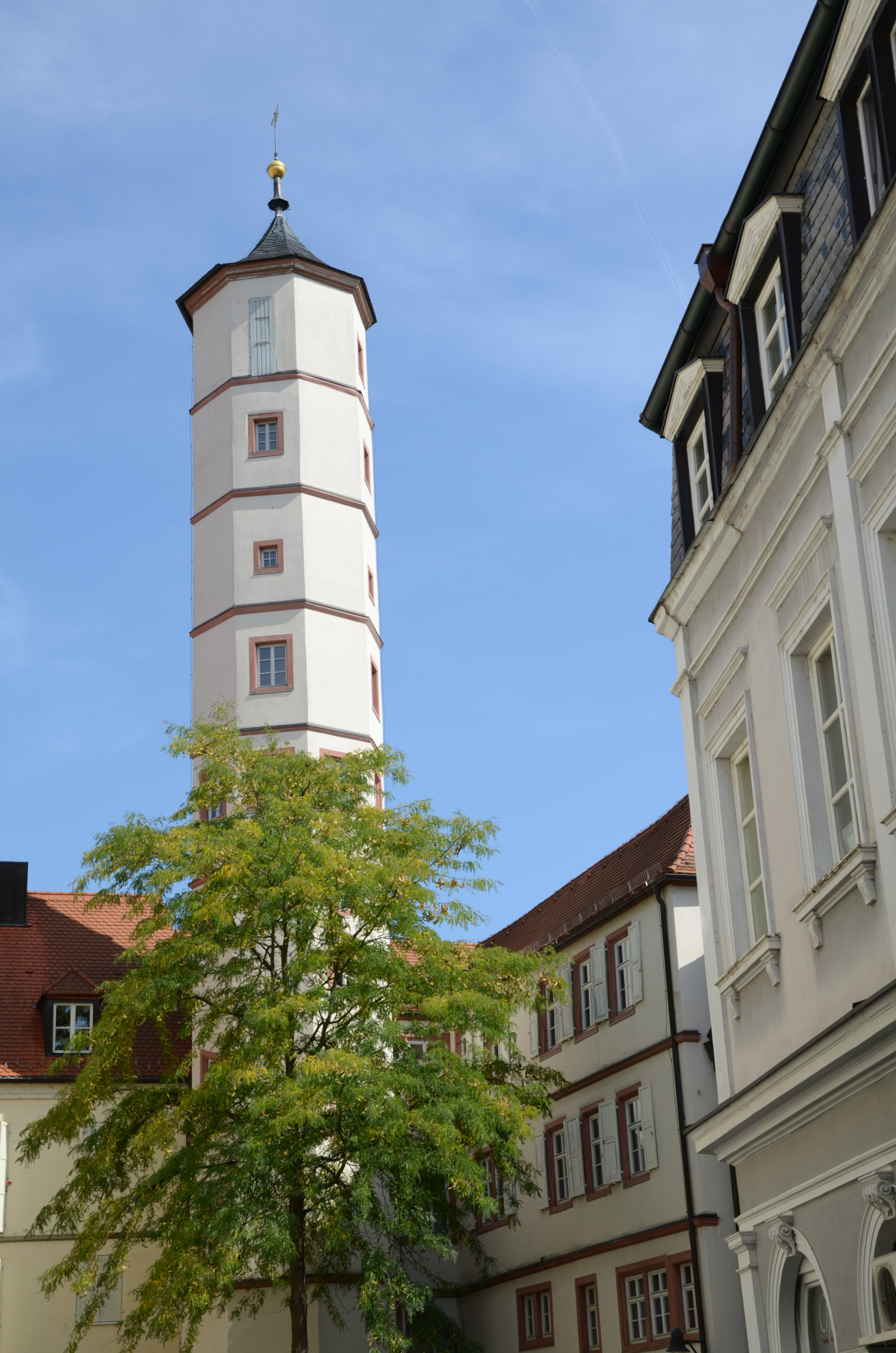
Old commercial quarter

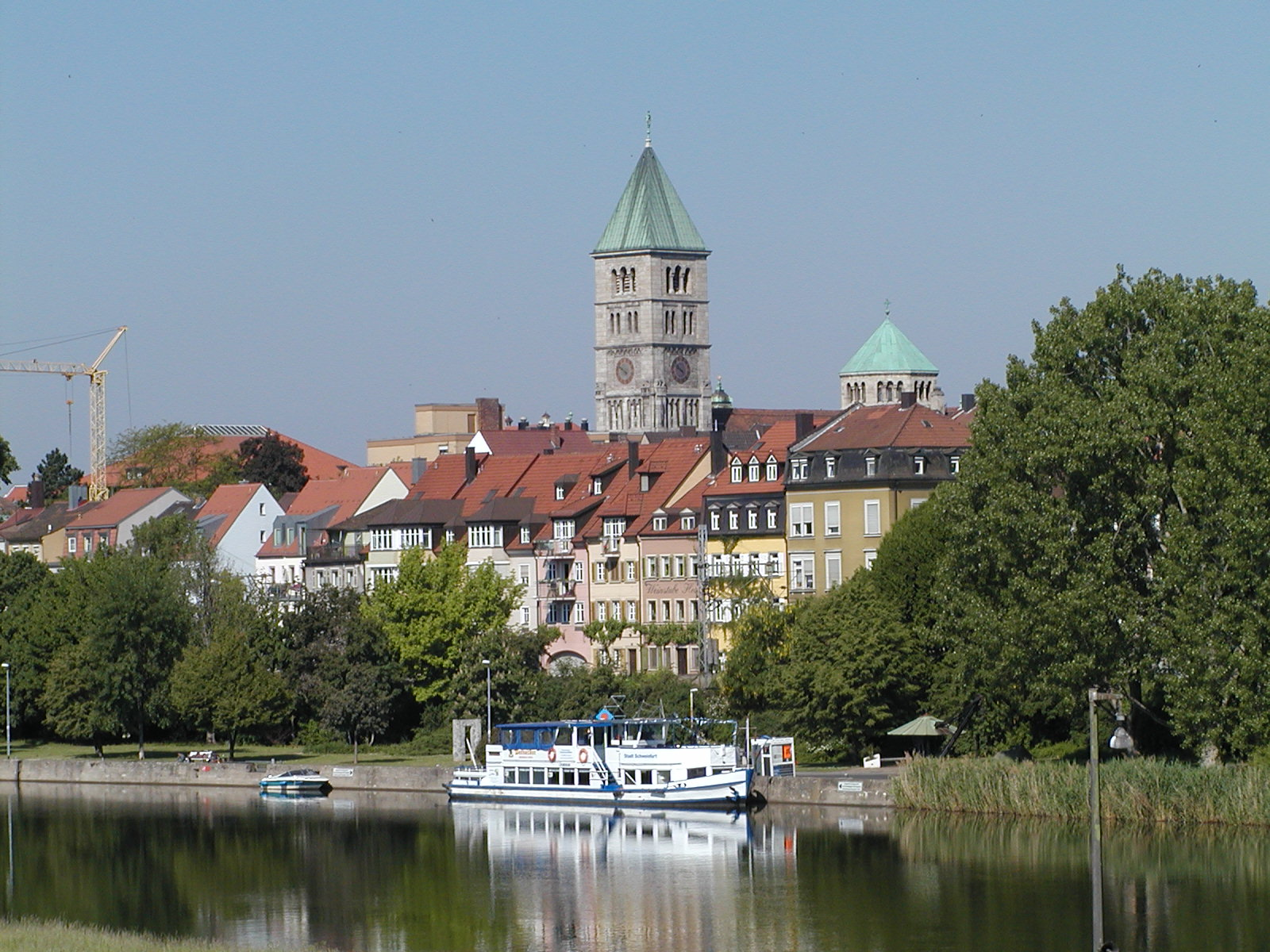
Old fishing district Fischerrain

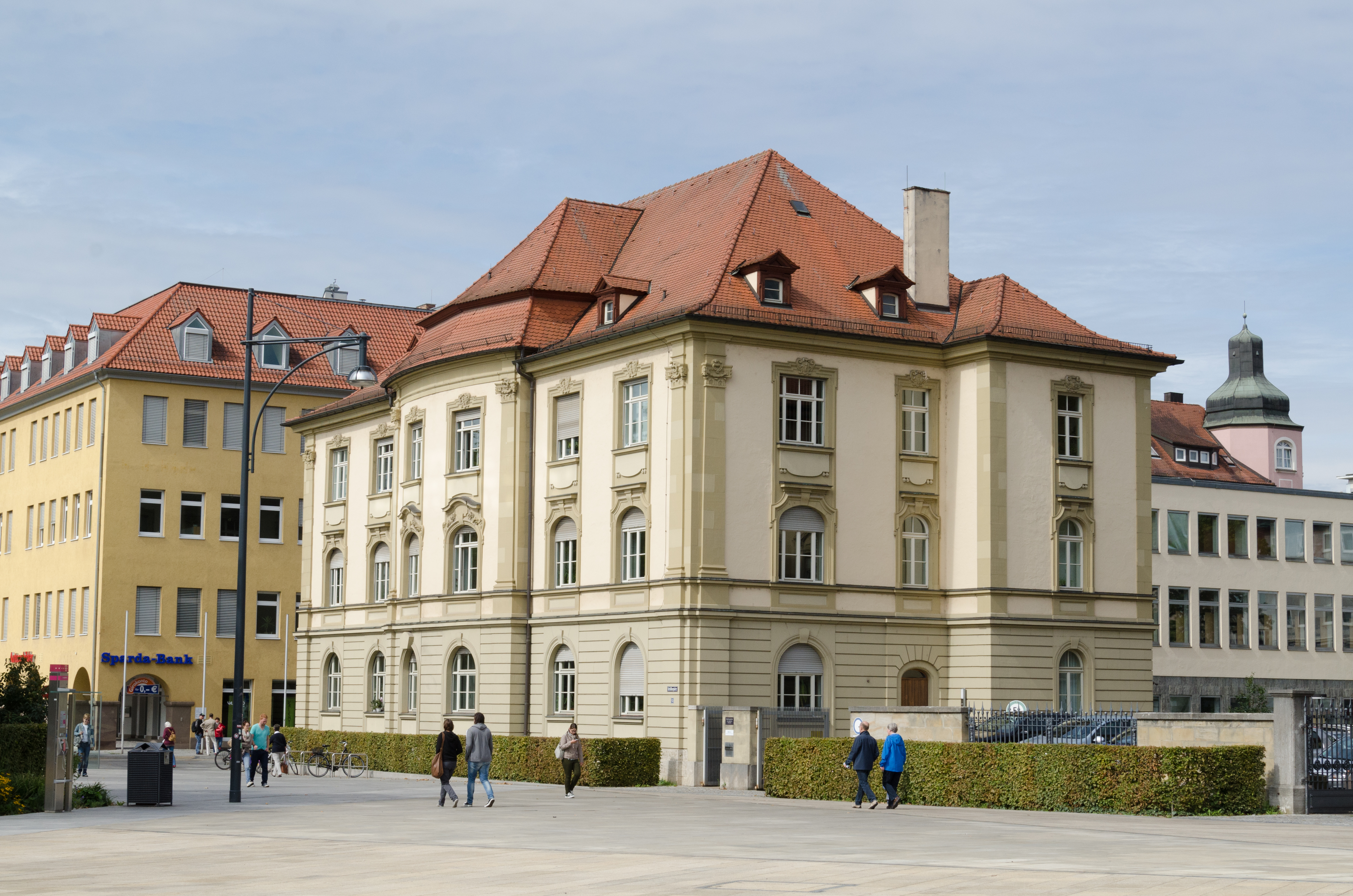
Schillerplatz

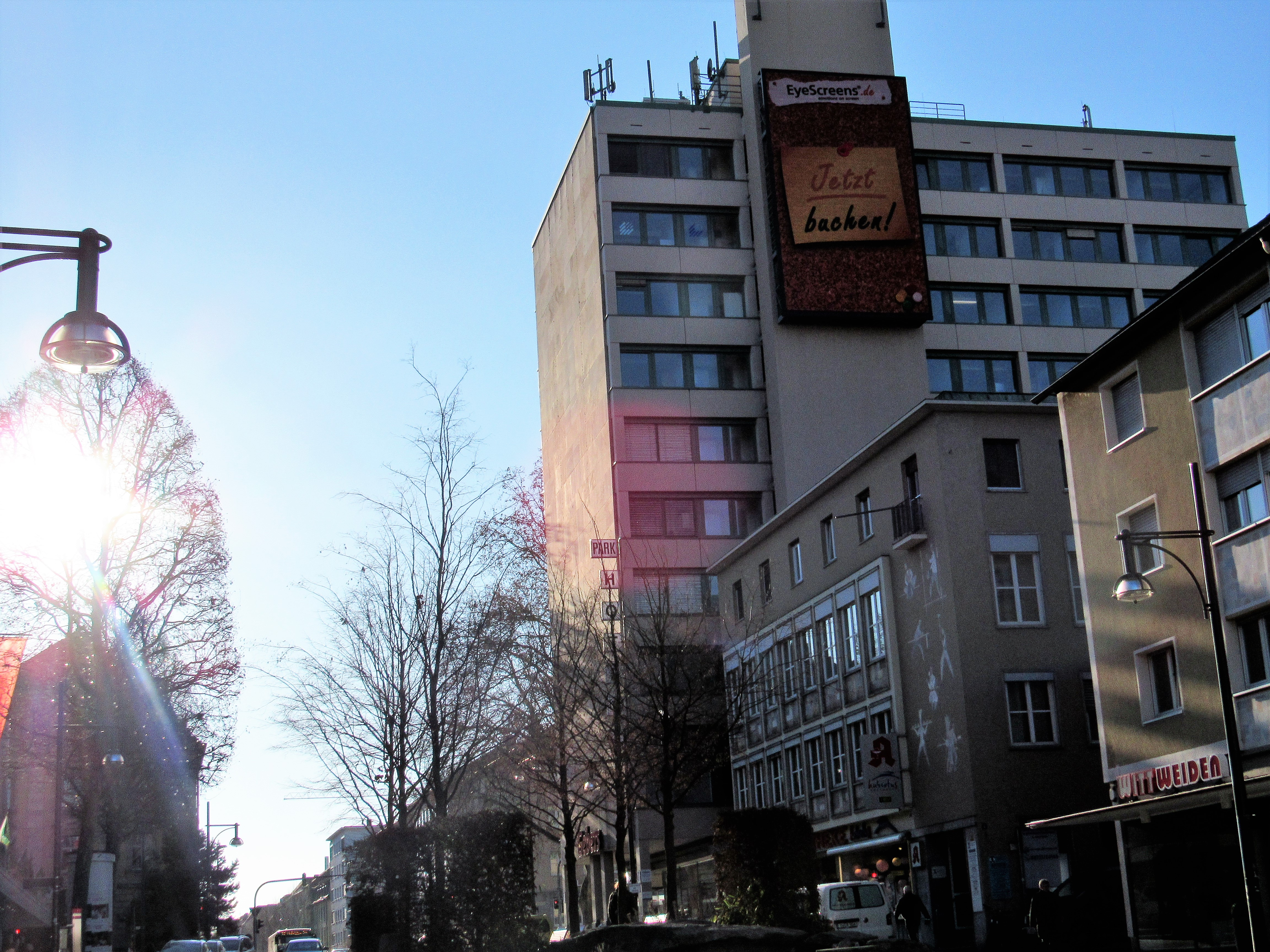
City with Iduna Building

=== Main sights ===
Schweinfurt's main landmarks include:

The Bookworm (1st version), c. 1850 by Carl Spitzweg

- The St. Johannes Church, first written mention in the year 1237, during the Romanesque period. Nearly all European architectural styles are represented in this church, with the gothic choir of the beginning of the 15th century and the baptismal font, with its original painting of 1367.
- The Ebracher Hof is a renaissance building, acquired in 1431 from the Cistercian monastery Ebrach. It burned down to the external walls during the Second Margrave War in 1554 and was reconstructed in 1578. The Schweinfurt City Library moved into the Ebracher Hof in 2006 after extensive refurbishing measures.
- The Old Town Hall was built 1570–1572. It is one of the most famous Renaissance town halls of Germany.
- The Old Grammar School, seat of the local museum, was built 1582–1583.
- The Museum Georg Schäfer (MGS) specializes in 19th-century paintings by artists from German-speaking countries. The museum has the world's most comprehensive collection of works by Carl Spitzweg. Further paintings by Caspar David Friedrich, Ferdinand Georg Waldmüller, Wilhelm von Kobell, Wilhelm Leibl, Adolph Menzel, Franz von Lenbach, Lovis Corinth, Max Liebermann, Max Slevogt and Max Beckmann.
- The Museum Otto Schäfer (MOS) with the famous Schedel's Chronicle of the World, printed in Nuremberg in 1493 and further book arts, graphic arts and applied arts by Albrecht Dürer, Lucas Cranach the Elder, Hans Holbein the Younger, Matthäus Merian the Elder, Caspar David Friedrich, Adolph Menzel, Max Slevogt and Lovis Corinth and graphic arts by Olaf Gulbransson.
- The Kunsthalle Schweinfurt (art gallery) also with temporary exhibitions, such as the Gunter Sachs Collection from the world-famous son of the Schweinfurt industrial dynasty Sachs (Fichtel & Sachs) in 2013/2014, with a who's who of international art history and pop art, with works by Andy Warhol, Roy Lichtenstein, Salvador Dalí, Max Ernst and others.
- The Sachs-Stadion from Paul Bonatz is a multi-functional football stadium in a spacious park with large trees and many other sports fields. Since 1936, it has been home stadium to the 1. FC Schweinfurt 05, after his first venue, the Stadion am Hutrasen.

The marketplace has a large Friedrich Rückert monument in the centre, around which weekly markets and many city festivals are held. Stadtgalerie Schweinfurt, a 300 m-long (980 ft) shopping mall, was built 2009.

Motherwell Park and Châteaudun Park connects the surrounding medieval buildings to the old town.

=== Music ===
Vendetta are a thrash metal group from Schweinfurt, founded in 1984.

=== Festivals ===
==== Schweinfurt Volksfest ====
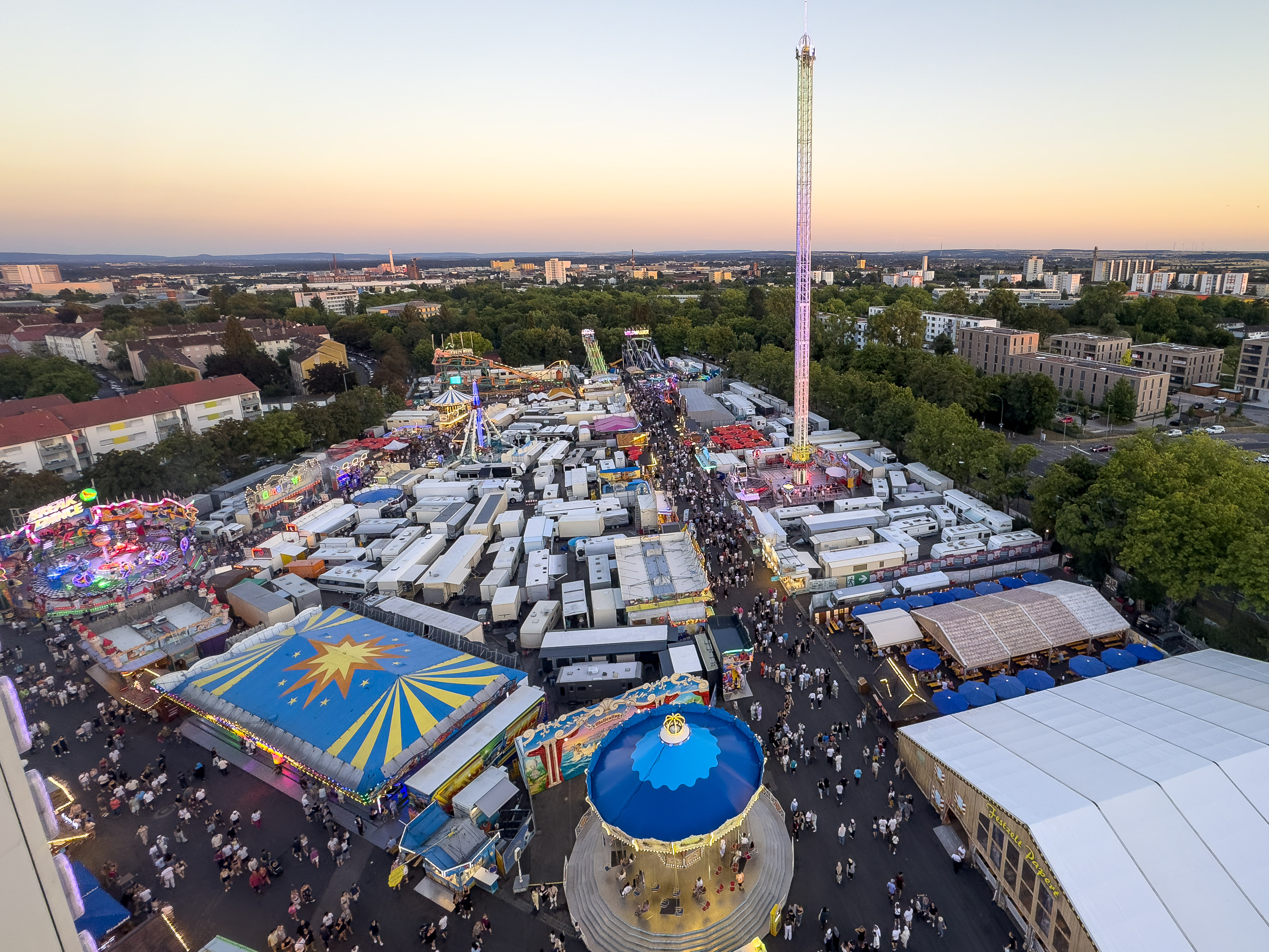
View of Schweinfurt Volksfest 2025 festival grounds from the Ferris wheel

Schweinfurt Volksfest (Schweinfurter Volksfest (German)) is an annual Volksfest (beer festival and travelling funfair) running for about ten days in summer. The festival features rides, a large beer tent, Franconian cuisine, live entertainment, fireworks and community events. It transforms the Volksfestplatz near the Niederwerrner Straße into a vibrant fairground with over 50 rides and stalls.

== Politics ==
- Schweinfurt (electoral district)

== Twin towns – sister cities ==
Schweinfurt is twinned with:

- Châteaudun, France
- Motherwell, Scotland, United Kingdom
- Seinäjoki, Finland
- Lutsk, Ukraine

== Notable people ==
=== Public Service and commerce ===
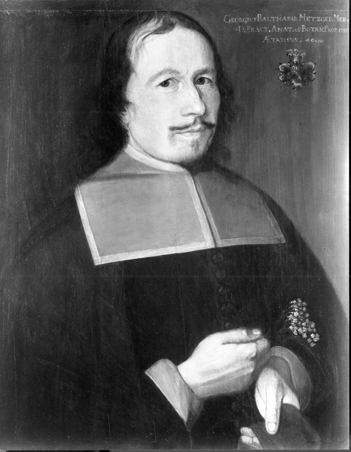
Georg Balthasar Metzger, 1663

- Judith of Schweinfurt (before 1003–1058), duchess consort of Bohemia
- Jacob Haylmann (1475–1526), architect
- Georg Balthasar Metzger (1623–1687), physician and founding member of the German National Academy of Sciences Leopoldina
- Andreas Mechwart (1834–1907), engineering pioneer
- Theodor Fischer (1862–1938), architect and professor
- Fritz Soldmann (1878–1945), politician, lived in Schweinfurt from 1903
- Albert Betz (1885–1968), physicist
- Willy Sachs (1896–1958), industrialist, in the Nazi era Obersturmbannführer and Wehrwirtschaftsführer
- Georg Schäfer (1896–1975), industrialist and art collector
- Karl Astel (1898–1945), rector of the University of Jena, racial scientist, involved in the Nazi eugenics program
- Kurt Pompe (1899–1964), Nazi SS concentration camp commandant
- Gerhard Eck (born 1960), politician
- Ivo Welch (born 1963), economist and university lecturer

=== The Arts ===
- Wolfgang Carl Briegel (1626–1712), composer and organist worked in Schweinfurt
- Johann Lorenz Bach (1695–1773), composer and organist
- Anna Margaretha Geiger (1783–1809), painter
- Friedrich Rückert (1788–1866), poet and translator
- Adam Darr (1811–1866), composer
- Gunter Sachs (1932–2011), art collector, photographer and industrialist
- Paul Maar (born 1937), children's books author
- Tommy Jaud (born 1970), screenwriter, novelist and writer
- Philipp Fröhlich (born 1975), painter
- Michael Wollny (born 1978), jazz pianist and professor

=== Sport ===
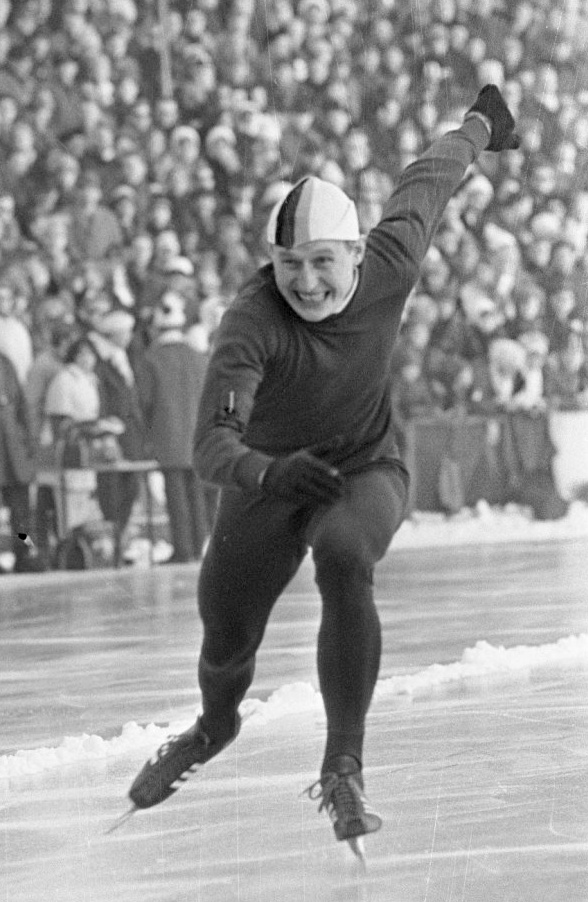
Günter Traub, 1967

- Albin Kitzinger (1912–1970), footballer, Germany international and FIFA continent selection player
- Robert Bernard (1913–1990), footballer, Germany international player
- Andreas Kupfer (1914–2001), footballer, Germany international and FIFA continent selection player
- Edi Ziegler (1930–2020), road racing cyclist
- Günter Bernard (born 1939), footballer, Germany international player
- Günter Traub (born 1939), speed skater
- Remig Stumpf (1966–2019), cyclist
- Kris McCray (born 1981), American mixed martial artist
- Stephan Schröck (born 1986), footballer, Philippines international player
- Thomas Meissner (born 1991), footballer
- Johannes Geis (born 1993), footballer
- Dominik Bokk (born 2000), ice hockey player

== Climate ==
Climate data for Bad Kissingen, (Note: Bad Kissingen is located approximately 20 kilometres (12.4 mi) north-west of Schweinfurt.) (1991–2020 normals)
Month	Jan	Feb	Mar	Apr	May	Jun	Jul	Aug	Sep	Oct	Nov	Dec	Year
Mean daily maximum °C (°F)	3.3 (37.9)	5.0 (41.0)	9.9 (49.8)	15.3 (59.5)	19.4 (66.9)	22.7 (72.9)	25.0 (77.0)	24.7 (76.5)	19.7 (67.5)	13.6 (56.5)	7.3 (45.1)	3.8 (38.8)	14.1 (57.4)
Daily mean °C (°F)	0.7 (33.3)	1.5 (34.7)	5.1 (41.2)	9.5 (49.1)	13.5 (56.3)	16.8 (62.2)	18.7 (65.7)	18.2 (64.8)	13.8 (56.8)	9.1 (48.4)	4.5 (40.1)	1.5 (34.7)	9.4 (48.9)
Mean daily minimum °C (°F)	−1.9 (28.6)	−1.8 (28.8)	0.8 (33.4)	3.9 (39.0)	7.7 (45.9)	11.0 (51.8)	12.9 (55.2)	12.5 (54.5)	8.9 (48.0)	5.4 (41.7)	2.0 (35.6)	−0.8 (30.6)	5.1 (41.2)
Average precipitation mm (inches)	59.5 (2.34)	45.0 (1.77)	45.1 (1.78)	34.2 (1.35)	60.6 (2.39)	58.7 (2.31)	76.6 (3.02)	59.2 (2.33)	49.3 (1.94)	53.3 (2.10)	56.9 (2.24)	68.7 (2.70)	665.8 (26.21)
Average precipitation days (≥ 1.0 mm)	16.4	13.8	14.1	11.9	13.4	14.0	14.5	13.5	12.1	15.3	16.5	18.1	173.1
Average snowy days (≥ 1.0 cm)	9.8	6.7	2.3	0.1	0	0	0	0	0	0	1.3	5.2	25.4
Average relative humidity (%)	85.4	81.3	75.0	67.8	70.7	70.9	70.8	72.2	78.6	85.7	88.9	88.5	78.0
Mean monthly sunshine hours	42.0	70.7	121.4	176.8	204.2	217.2	226.5	209.2	148.9	92.2	39.6	28.6	1,590.8
Source: World Meteorological Organization
