= Augsburg derby =

German association football game

The Augsburg derby (German: Augsburger Derby) is an association football game between TSV Schwaben Augsburg and BC Augsburg and, in more recent times, a game between Schwaben Augsburg and FC Augsburg, all three clubs based in the Bavarian city of Augsburg. In 1969 the football department of Schwaben merged with BCA to form FC Augsburg, putting a temporary halt on the derby games. Schwaben soon reformed its football department and the two sides eventually met again at league level in 1981. Since 2001 the fortunes of the two clubs have vastly differed with FCA reaching the Bundesliga in 2011 while Schwaben dropped as far as the seventh tier Bezirksliga Schwaben Süd. In May 2024 the football team of TSV 1847 Schwaben Augsburg acheaved fourth tier Regionalliga Bayern.

== History ==
=== Schwaben Augsburg ===
Both Schwaben and BC Augsburg went through a number of name changes in their early years. Originally TSV Schwaben Augsburg was formed as the gymnastics club TV 1847 Augsburg in 1847 while the football department of the club dates back to 1902 when it was formed within the MTV Augsburg. After the First World War TV, MTV and SV Schwaben Augsburg merged. The team played as TV 1847 Augsburg until 1926, became SSV Schwaben Augsburg from then, briefly combined with TG Viktoria Augsburg in the early years of the Second World War before playing as TSV 1847 Schwaben Augsburg from 1942 to 1969. After the merger of the football department with BC Augsburg to form FC Augsburg Schwaben was initially prohibited from fielding a team. Those members of the club disagreeing with the merger joined Eintracht Augsburg for a season but returned to Schwaben in 1970 again. The footballers had to restart in the lowest division, the tier eight C-Klasse Augsburg, and worked their way up through the league system from there. In 1981 the team won promotion to the Bayernliga where it met FC Augsburg for the first time, freshly relegated from the 2. Bundesliga. Schwaben fluctuated between the Bayernliga and the Landesliga from there, on occasion sharing the league with their local rival FCA. At the end of the 2001–02 Bayernliga season the destinations of the two sides separated with Schwaben dropping out of the Bayernliga permanently in 2003 while FCA moved up in the league system.

=== BC Augsburg ===
BC Augsburg was formed in the working class Augsburg suburb of Oberhausen as the FC Alemannia Augsburg, joined TV 1871 Oberhausen in 1909 and soon after became independent as the BC Augsburg. In 1935 BCA merged with SV Augsburg, at the time the third force of football in Augsburg, greatly improving the club's fortunes. After the merger with the football department of Schwaben BCA ceased to exist, unlike Schwaben, with the new club FC Augsburg taking over the traditions of the BCA, taking the year 1907 as its formation year.

=== BC Augsburg versus Schwaben ===
Derbies between the two sides, BCA and Schwaben, than as TV Augsburg, were played from the 1920–21 season onward. The two clubs competed in the southern division of the tier one Kreisliga Bayern, a league where seven of the ten clubs hailed from Munich and two Augsburg. The early years saw TVA, seen as the club of the local business elite, dominate over the working class club BCA. This dominance only changed in the mid-1930s, after BCA had merged with SV Augsburg. The local derby between the two clubs attracted attention soon after its initiation, being hailed in local Augsburg newspapers as the game of the year as early as 1927. The early years saw TVA, later Schwaben, compete at highest level, the Bezirksliga Bayern, while BCA usually played one below, the Kreisliga Schwaben. With the rise of the Nazis to power in 1933 the Gauliga Bayern was introduced as the highest level in Bavaria, with BCA competing at this level from 1934 onward while Schwaben fluctuated between this league and the level below. While the local derby between the two was dominated by Schwaben in the 1920s BCA reversed this role in the 1930s.

In post-Second World War football the two clubs competed predominantly in the tier one Oberliga Süd and the league below, the 2. Oberliga Süd. Schwaben briefly dropped to the third level, the Bayernliga, from 1958 to 1960, finished runners-up behind BCA in the 2. Oberliga in 1961 and spend the last two seasons before the introduction of the Bundesliga back in the Oberliga together with their rival. The 1962–63 Oberliga season saw the clubs finish in the bottom two spots of the league and missing out on Bundesliga qualification. Schwaben played one more good season in the new Regionalliga Süd in 1963–64, coming fourth while BCA was relegated. The latter returned to the Regionalliga for one more season in 1966–67, the last-ever season the two clubs played in the same league. Schwaben would have joined BCA in the Bayernliga in 1969–70 after also suffering Regionalliga relegation but the merger prevented the team from competing.

=== FC Augsburg versus Schwaben Augsburg ===
The new FC Augsburg was not an instant success, taking until 1973 to win the Bayernliga and promotion to the tier two Regionalliga. It entered the new 2. Bundesliga from 1974 onward but suffered relegation in 1979 and 1981. As the latter season saw Schwaben win promotion to the Bayernliga the two clubs met in the same league for the first time since the merger, playing each other in the 1981–82 Bayernliga season. With FCA winning promotion but also being relegated again in 1983 the two clubs played against each other in the Bayernliga in 1983–84, 1988 to 1990, 1991–92 and 2000–01. Schwaben, in this era, fluctuated between the Landesliga and the Bayernliga while FCA was, for the most part, a top of the table side in the Bayernliga and played, from 1994, in the newly reformed Regionalliga Süd. FCA was forcibly relegated to the Bayernliga in 2000, where it played for two more seasons. Since 2001 the fortunes of the two clubs have been fundamentally different. FCA won promotion back to the Regionalliga in 2002, to the 2. Bundesliga in 2006 and the Bundesliga in 2011, the highest league in Germany, while Schwaben moved the other way, dropping to the tier seven Bezirksliga by 2012.

The last competitive league game between the two sides played was a Bayernliga match on 25 November 2000 which Schwaben won 2–1.

From 2005 to 2007 Schwaben played in the same league as the reserve team of FCA, FC Augsburg II, but the latter eventually won promotion out of the Landesliga Bayern-Süd, competing at league levels above Schwaben just like the senior team.

== List of games ==
=== BC Augsburg versus Schwaben Augsburg ===
The league games between the two clubs:

Season	League	Tier	Teams	Home	Away
1920–21	Kreisliga Bayern	I	TV 1847 Augsburg – BC Augsburg	4–1	2–0
1921–22	Kreisliga Bayern	I	TV 1847 Augsburg – BC Augsburg	3–0	3–0
1924–25	Bezirksliga Bayern	I	SSV Schwaben Augsburg – BC Augsburg	3–0	3–1
1934–35	Gauliga Bayern	I	SSV Schwaben Augsburg – BC Augsburg	0–2	1–2
1937–38	Gauliga Bayern	I	SSV Schwaben Augsburg – BC Augsburg	0–2	2–0
1938–39	Gauliga Bayern	I	SSV Schwaben Augsburg – BC Augsburg	3–0	2–4
1940–41	Gauliga Bayern	I	Schwaben/Viktoria Augsburg – BC Augsburg	1–2	0–0
1941–42	Gauliga Bayern	I	Schwaben/Viktoria Augsburg – BC Augsburg	2–0	1–3
1942–43	Gauliga Bayern	I	TSV Schwaben Augsburg – BC Augsburg	2–3	0–0
1943–44	Gauliga Bayern	I	TSV Schwaben Augsburg – BC Augsburg	0–2	0–2
1944–45	Gauliga Bayern	I	TSV Schwaben Augsburg – BC Augsburg	6–1	1–3
1945–46	Oberliga Süd	I	TSV Schwaben Augsburg – BC Augsburg	3–0	2–2
1946–47	Oberliga Süd	I	TSV Schwaben Augsburg – BC Augsburg	1–1	1–0
1948–49	Oberliga Süd	I	TSV Schwaben Augsburg – BC Augsburg	2–3	4–0
1949–50	Oberliga Süd	I	TSV Schwaben Augsburg – BC Augsburg	1–1	0–3
1950–51	Oberliga Süd	I	TSV Schwaben Augsburg – BC Augsburg	1–1	0–5
1954–55	Oberliga Süd	I	TSV Schwaben Augsburg – BC Augsburg	1–4	1–2
1955–56	Oberliga Süd	I	TSV Schwaben Augsburg – BC Augsburg	2–1	3–2
1956–57	Oberliga Süd	I	TSV Schwaben Augsburg – BC Augsburg	5–2	1–3
1960–61	2. Oberliga Süd	II	TSV Schwaben Augsburg – BC Augsburg	0–3	0–1
1961–62	Oberliga Süd	I	TSV Schwaben Augsburg – BC Augsburg	2–0	1–0
1962–63	Oberliga Süd	I	TSV Schwaben Augsburg – BC Augsburg	0–1	2–3
1963–64	Regionalliga Süd	II	TSV Schwaben Augsburg – BC Augsburg	0–0	1–1
1966–67	Regionalliga Süd	II	TSV Schwaben Augsburg – BC Augsburg	1–0	2–0

=== FC Augsburg versus Schwaben Augsburg ===
The league games between the two clubs:

Season	League	Tier	Teams	Home	Away
1981–82	Bayernliga	III	TSV Schwaben Augsburg – FC Augsburg	1–2	0–3
1983–84	Bayernliga	III	TSV Schwaben Augsburg – FC Augsburg	0–2	0–3
1988–89	Bayernliga	III	TSV Schwaben Augsburg – FC Augsburg	1–1	0–0
1989–90	Bayernliga	III	TSV Schwaben Augsburg – FC Augsburg	0–0	2–2
1991–92	Bayernliga	III	TSV Schwaben Augsburg – FC Augsburg	1–3	3–2
2000–01	Bayernliga	IV	TSV Schwaben Augsburg – FC Augsburg	2–3	2–1

== See also ==
- Bavarian football derbies
