= 1943–44 Gauliga Bayern =

Gauliga Bayern
- Season: 1943–44
- Champions: North: 1. FC Nürnberg; South: FC Bayern Munich
- Relegated: none
- German championship: 1. FC Nürnberg; FC Bayern Munich

The 1943–44 Gauliga Bayern was the eleventh season of the league, one of the 31 Gauligas in Germany at the time. It was the first tier of the football league system in Bavaria (German:Bayern) from 1933 to 1945. It was the second and last season of the league being sub-divided into a northern and southern division, the Gauliga Nordbayern and Gauliga Südbayern, with further sub-dividing taking place in the uncompleted 1944–45 season.

For FC Bayern Munich it was the only Gauliga championship while, for 1. FC Nürnberg, it was the seventh and last the club would win in the era from 1933 to 1944. Unlike TSV 1860 in the previous season FC Bayern did not receive an invitation by the Lord Mayor of Munich, Karl Fiehler, to celebrate their title at the town hall, the club having been unpopular with the Nazis because of its past Jewish connections. Both Gauliga champions qualified for the 1944 German football championship, where Bayern Munich was knocked out in the first preliminary round after losing 2–1 to VfR Mannheim while Nürnberg lost 3–1 to eventual winners Dresdner SC in the semi-finals.

== Table ==
The 1943–44 saw a number of Kriegsspielgemeinschaft teams compete in the league, shortened as KSG. The KSG's were unified teams formed from two or more clubs but not mergers of these clubs.

=== North ===
The 1943–44 season saw two new clubs in the league, WTSV Schweinfurt and KSG Post/Reichsbahn Nürnberg/Fürth.

Pos	Team	Pld	W	D	L	GF	GA	GD	Pts	Promotion, qualification or relegation
1	1. FC Nürnberg (C)	18	13	2	3	85	23	+62	28	Qualification to German championship
2	1. FC Bamberg	18	11	3	4	62	45	+17	25	
3	VfL Nürnberg	18	9	4	5	35	31	+4	22	
4	VfR 07 Schweinfurt	18	8	4	6	39	35	+4	20	
5	KSG 1. FC 05/LSV Schweinfurt (Note: KSG 1. FC 05/LSV Schweinfurt was the combined team of 1. FC Schweinfurt 05 and LSV Schweinfurt)	18	10	0	8	41	40	+1	20	
6	SpVgg Fürth	18	9	1	8	53	31	+22	19	
7	WTSV Schweinfurt	18	9	0	9	54	46	+8	18	
8	KSG Post/Reichsbahn Nürnberg/Fürth	18	5	4	9	37	51	−14	14	
9	Reichsbahn SG Weiden	18	3	2	13	24	64	−40	8	
10	KSG FV 04/Kickers Würzburg (Note: KSG FV 04/ Kickers Würzburg was the combined team of FV 04 Würzburg and Würzburger Kickers)	18	1	4	13	22	86	−64	6	

Source: claudionicoletti.eu
Rules for classification: 1) Points;
(C) Champions

=== South ===
The 1943–44 season saw two new clubs in the league, KSG MTV/VfB Ingolstadt and TSV Pfersee.

Pos	Team	Pld	W	D	L	GF	GA	GD	Pts	Promotion, qualification or relegation
1	FC Bayern Munich (C)	18	15	1	2	56	15	+41	31	Qualification to German championship
2	KSG BC/Post Augsburg (Note: KSG BC/Post Augsburg was the combined team of BC Augsburg and Post-SG Augsburg)	18	13	1	4	56	17	+39	27	
3	TSV 1860 München	18	11	3	4	54	33	+21	25	
4	LSV Straubing	18	9	4	5	26	27	−1	22	
5	SSV Jahn Regensburg	18	7	2	9	34	30	+4	16	
6	FC Wacker München	18	7	2	9	30	33	−3	16	
7	KSG MTV/VfB Ingolstadt (Note: KSG MTV/VfB Ingolstadt was the combined team of MTV Ingolstadt and VfB Ingolstadt)	18	6	3	9	38	57	−19	15	
8	Schwaben Augsburg	18	6	2	10	22	35	−13	14	
9	TSV Pfersee	18	3	2	13	20	52	−32	8	
10	TSG Augsburg	18	3	0	15	24	61	−37	6	

Source: claudionicoletti.eu
Rules for classification: 1) Points;
(C) Champions
