= Albin Kitzinger =

German footballer

Personal information
- Full name: Albin Kitzinger
- Date of birth: 1 February 1912
- Place of birth: Schweinfurt, Kingdom of Bavaria, German Empire
- Date of death: 6 August 1970 (aged 58)
- Position: Midfielder

Youth career
- 1924-1929: 1. FC Schweinfurt 05

Senior career*
Years	Team	Apps	(Gls)
1929–1950	1. FC Schweinfurt 05		

International career
1935–1942	Germany	44	(2)
- * Club domestic league appearances and goals

Albin Kitzinger (1 February 1912 in Schweinfurt – 6 August 1970) was a German football player. He played his whole career for 1. FC Schweinfurt 05.

== Career ==
On the national level he played for Germany national team (44 matches/2 goals), and was a participant at the 1938 FIFA World Cup. He was a member of the Breslau Eleven that beat Denmark 8–0 in Breslau in 1937 and went on to win 10 out of 11 games played during that year.

Kitzinger distinguished himself with assuredness on the ball and the calmness in which he distributed the ball. Together with Andreas Kupfer and Ludwig Goldbrunner he formed one of the best halves trios of the late-1930s. In 1937 he was called up to represent Western Europe in Amsterdam against Central Europe, and a year later he was selected to play in a FIFA Europe XI against England at Highbury Stadium. Altogether he starred in 826 games for his club Schweinfurt 05. He died at the age of 58 after a long and severe illness.

== Honours ==
=== Club ===
- Gauliga Bayern
  - Champion: (2) 1938–39, 1941–42
  - Runner-up: (2) 1936–37, 1942–43
- Tschammerpokal
  - Semi-finalist: 1936

=== Individual ===
- Europe XI selection: 1938
