= German football rivalries =

Association football rivalries in Germany

This is a list of the main association football rivalries in Germany.

== Domestic club football ==
=== Inter-regional ===
First Party	Second Party	Nickname, if applicable	Notes	References
Bayern Munich	Borussia Dortmund	Der Klassiker ('the classic').	Viewed as Bundesliga equivalent to the Spanish El Clásico	
Bayern Munich	Hamburger SV	Nord-Süd-Gipfel ('north–south summit').		
Bayern Munich	Schalke 04			
Bayern Munich	Borussia Mönchengladbach			https://www.muenchen-online.de/sonstiges/die-5-legendaersten-rivalitaeten-des-fc-bayern-muenchen/
Bayern Munich	VfB Stuttgart	Südderby ('southern derby'), Südgipfel ('southern summit'), Südschlager ('southern blockbuster').		
Werder Bremen	Bayern Munich	Nord-Süd Klassiker ('North-South classic')	Name for the two long-standing Bundesliga rivals in German top flight. The matches between them is the most often played in German top flight.	
Werder Bremen	Hamburger SV	Nordderby ('northern derby').		
Preußen Münster	VfL Osnabrück	Grenzlandderby ('borderlands derby')	Name of derby referencing the border between North Rhine-Westphalia and Lower Saxony.	
1. FC Kaiserslautern	1. FC Saarbrücken	Südwest derby ('south-western derby')		
1. FC Kaiserslautern	SV Waldhof Mannheim	Südwest derby ('south-western derby')		
Kickers Offenbach	SV Waldhof Mannheim			
Hansa Rostock	FC St. Pauli	Politisches derby ('political derby')	Name of derby references the leftist alignments of St Pauli and rightist alignments of Rostock.	

=== Regional ===
==== Baden-Württemberg ====
First Party	Second Party	Nickname, if applicable	Notes	References
Karlsruher SC	VfB Stuttgart	Baden-Schwaben-Derby ('Baden–Swabia derby')		
SC Freiburg	VfB Stuttgart	Baden-Schwaben-Derby ('Baden–Swabia derby')		
SC Freiburg	Karlsruher SC	Baden-Derby		
1. FC Heidenheim	VfR Aalen	Ostalb-Derby		

==== Bavaria ====
First Party	Second Party	Nickname, if applicable	Notes	References
1. FC Nürnberg	Bayern Munich	Bavarian derby		
1. FC Nürnberg	Greuther Fürth	Franconian derby		
FC Augsburg	1860 Munich	FC Augsburg–1860 Munich rivalry		
FC Augsburg	FC Ingolstadt	Augsburg–Ingolstadt derby		
Jahn Regensburg	FC Ingolstadt	Danube river derby		

==== Former East Germany ====
First Party	Second Party	Nickname, if applicable	Notes	References
Erzgebirge Aue	FSV Zwickau	Erzgebirgsderby ('Ore Mountains derby')		
Erzgebirge Aue	Chemnitzer FC			
Hallescher FC	Chemnitzer FC			
Carl Zeiss Jena	Rot-Weiß Erfurt	Thuringia derby		
Union Berlin	Hansa Rostock			
Union Berlin	Dynamo Dresden			
1. FC Magdeburg	Dynamo Dresden	Elb-Clasico		
BFC Dynamo	Dynamo Dresden		Two most successful teams in DDR-Oberliga	
BFC Dynamo	SV Babelsberg	Political derby		
Energie Cottbus	SV Babelsberg	Brandenburg derby	The derby also has a strong political element due to the leftist alignments of Babelsberg and rightist alignments of Cottbus.	

There is no official 'Ost-Derby' (East-derby) because if 2 clubs, from the former DDR league(or Herta BSC), are playing in one of the higher german leagues the games are classified, by fans as well as police, very intensive and important. Each of them could count as their own derby despite not having their own phonetic name assgined to it.

==== Hesse ====
First Party	Second Party	Nickname, if applicable	Notes	References
Eintracht Frankfurt	Darmstadt 98	Hesse derby		
Eintracht Frankfurt	Kickers Offenbach	Main derby		
Darmstadt 98	Kickers Offenbach			

==== Schleswig-Holstein ====
First Party	Second Party	Nickname, if applicable	Notes	References
VfB Lübeck	Holstein Kiel	Holstein derby		

==== Lower Saxony ====
First Party	Second Party	Nickname, if applicable	Notes	References
Hannover 96	Eintracht Braunschweig	Lower Saxony derby		
SV Meppen	VfL Osnabrück			
SV Meppen	VfB Oldenburg			

==== North Rhine-Westphalia ====
First Party	Second Party	Nickname, if applicable	Notes	References
Borussia Dortmund	Schalke 04	Revierderby	Games between Ruhr teams: Borussia Dortmund, Schalke 04, VfL Bochum, MSV Duisburg, Rot-Weiss Essen, Rot-Weiß Oberhausen and SG Wattenscheid are also sometimes called Revierderbies, more often called Kleine (Small) Revierderby for disambiguation purposes.	
Borussia Dortmund	Borussia Mönchengladbach	Borussen derby		
1. FC Köln	Borussia Mönchengladbach	Rhine derby	Any other game between Borussia Mönchengladbach, 1. FC Köln, Fortuna Düsseldorf and Bayer Leverkusen may also occasionally be called Rheinland derby.	
1. FC Köln	Bayer Leverkusen			
1. FC Köln	Fortuna Düsseldorf			
Arminia Bielefeld	SC Preußen Münster	Westphalian derby	Sometimes other games between teams of this area are labelled Westphalian derby, e.g. Arminia Bielefeld v. Borussia Dortmund.	
FC Gütersloh	SC Verl	Gütersloh district derby		
FC Gütersloh	SC Wiedenbrück	Gütersloh district derby		
SC Verl	SC Wiedenbrück	Gütersloh district derby		

==== Saarland ====
First Party	Second Party	Nickname, if applicable	Notes	References
1. FC Saarbrücken	FC 08 Homburg	Saarland derby		
1. FC Saarbrücken	SV Elversberg	Saarland derby		
FC 08 Homburg	SV Elversberg	Saarland derby		

=== Local ===
- Bavarian football derbies:
  - Munich derby: Bayern Munich vs. 1860 Munich
  - Nürnberg derby: 1. FC Nürnberg vs. Dergahspor Nürnberg
  - Unterhaching–Munich derby: SpVgg Unterhaching vs. Bayern Munich or 1860 Munich
  - Augsburg derby: TV 1847 Augsburg vs. BC Augsburg
  - Würzburg derby: Würzburger Kickers vs. Würzburger FV
- Dortmund derby:
  - Dortmund derby: Borussia Dortmund vs. ASC 09 Dortmund
- Mönchengladbach derby:
  - Mönchengladbach derby: Borussia Mönchengladbach vs. SV Mönchengladbach 1910 vs. 1. FC Mönchengladbach 1894 e.V
- Bremen derby:
  - Bremen derby: Werder Bremen vs. Bremer SV
- Leverkusen derby:
  - Leverkusen derby: Bayer Leverkusen vs. SV Bergfried 1962 e.V.
- Gelsenkirchen derby:
  - Gelsenkirchen derby: Schalke 04 vs. DJK Teutonia Schalke-Nord 1921 e.V.
- Wolfsburg derby:
  - Wolfsburg derby: VfL Wolfsburg vs. 1. FC Wolfsburg
- Berliner derbies:
  - East–West Berlin derby: Union Berlin vs. Hertha BSC
  - East Berlin derby: Union Berlin vs. BFC Dynamo
- Sinsheim derby:
  - Sinsheim derby: TSG 1899 Hoffenheim vs. SV 1910 Sinsheim
- Bochum derby: VfL Bochum vs. SG Wattenscheid
- Brandenburg derby: Brandenburger SC vs. Stahl Brandenburg
- Cologne derby: 1. FC Köln vs. Fortuna Köln vs. Viktoria Köln
- Essen derby: Rot-Weiss Essen vs. Schwarz-Weiß Essen
- Frankfurt derby: Eintracht Frankfurt vs. FSV Frankfurt
- Hamburg derby: Hamburger SV vs. FC St. Pauli
- Herzogenaurach (Adidas–Puma) derby: ASV Herzogenaurach vs. 1. FC Herzogenaurach
- Leipzig derby: BSG Chemie Leipzig vs. 1. FC Lokomotive Leipzig
- Oldenburg derby: VfB Oldenburg vs. VfL Oldenburg
- Stuttgart derby: VfB Stuttgart vs. Stuttgarter Kickers
- Kaiserslautern derby: 1. FC Kaiserslautern vs. VfR Kaiserslautern

== European club football ==
Real Madrid versus Bayern Munich is the match that has historically been played most often in the Champions League/European Cup with 26 matches. Real's former biggest loss at home in the Champions League came at the hands of Bayern on 29 February 2000 (2–4). Due to Bayern being traditionally hard to beat for Madrid, Madrid supporters often refer to Bayern as the "Bestia negra" ("Black Beast"). Despite the number of duels, Bayern and Real have never met in the final of a Champions League or European Cup.

== National team ==
The German national team also has many rivalries, including with the Netherlands, Italy, England and France. When there were two German national teams, West and East Germany, they were also rivals.

=== Netherlands ===
The Germany–Netherlands football rivalry is one of the few longstanding football rivalries at a national level. Beginning in 1974 when the Dutch lost the 1974 FIFA World Cup to West Germany in the final (though deeply rooted in Dutch anti-German sentiment due to the German occupation of the Netherlands during World War II) the rivalry between the two nations has become one of the best known international football rivalries in the world.

Both football nations have been among the top ranked according to the strongest football nations by Elo Ratings, and have met a total of 45 times (of which 14 matches were competitive) which resulted in 16 victories for Germany, 17 draws, and 12 victories for the Netherlands.

=== Italy ===
The Germany–Italy football rivalry between the national football teams of Germany and Italy is a long-running one. Overall, the two teams have won eight FIFA World Cup championships (four each) and made a total of fourteen appearances in the final of the tournament (eight by Germany and six by Italy) - more than all other European countries combined. They have played against each other five times in the World Cup, and many of these matches have been notable in the history of the tournament. "Game of the Century", the 1970 semi-final between the two countries which Italy won 4–3 after extra time, was so dramatic that it is commemorated by a plaque at the entrance of the Estadio Azteca in Mexico City.

Germany has also won the European Championship three times while Italy has won it twice. The two countries have faced each other four times in the European championship, with one German victory, one Italian victory and two draws. While Germany has won more international championships, Italy is largely dominant in the head-to-head international match-up, having beaten Germany 15 times in 39 games, with 13 draws and 11 defeats. Moreover, Germany had never beaten Italy in a major tournament match until their win in the Euro 2016 quarter-finals on penalties, with all of Germany's other wins over Italy coming in friendly competitions. However, the draw between the two teams in the group stage of Euro 1996 eliminated Italy from the tournament, while Germany qualified for the knockout stage with the draw and went on to win the tournament.

=== England ===
The England–Germany football rivalry is considered to be mainly an English phenomenon—in the run-up to any competition match between the two teams, many UK newspapers will print articles detailing results of previous encounters, such as those in 1966, 1990 and 1996. Football fans in England often consider Germany to be their main sporting rivals and care more about this rivalry than those with other nations, such as Argentina or Scotland. Most German fans consider the Netherlands and Italy to be their traditional footballing rivals, and as such usually the rivalry is not taken quite as seriously there as it is in England.

The English and German national football teams have played each other since the end of the 19th century, and officially since 1930. The teams met for the first time in November 1899, when England beat Germany in four straight matches. Notable matches between England and Germany (or West Germany) include the 1966 FIFA World Cup Final (which England won), and the semi-finals of the 1990 FIFA World Cup and UEFA Euro 1996 (both of which West Germany/Germany won, and went on to win the whole tournament in each case) .

=== France ===
The France–Germany football rivalry is one of Europe's most prominent international fixtures, featuring two of the world's most successful national teams. While traditionally viewed by Germans as secondary to their rivalries with the Netherlands or Italy, it grew significantly following France's rise in the 1990s and highly competitive tournament matches in the 2010s and 2020s. The rivalry features iconic historic clashes, including the dramatic 1982 World Cup semi-final known as the "Night of Seville", where West Germany won on penalties, and Germany's 1–0 quarter-final victory en route to winning the 2014 FIFA World Cup. In recent years, France has held a highly competitive edge, securing key victories at Euro 2016, Euro 2020, and the 2025 UEFA Nations League Finals.

=== East Germany vs. West Germany ===
The East Germany–West Germany football rivalry was an association football rivalry between teams from East Germany and West Germany, existing from 1949 to 1990, while two separate German countries existed.

Clubs from the two countries met at official level in both national team and club competitions like the FIFA World Cup or the European Cup. While the West German national team received strong support in East Germany, with supporters from the East often travelling to away matches of the West German team in Eastern Europe, encounters between teams from the East and West in European Cup competitions were often hard-fought.

== See also ==
- Association football and politics
- Football hooliganism#Germany
- List of association football club rivalries in Europe
