= 1934–35 Gauliga Bayern =

Gauliga Bayern
- Season: 1934–35
- Champions: SpVgg Fürth
- Relegated: SpVgg Weiden; SSV Jahn Regensburg; TSV Schwaben Augsburg
- German championship: SpVgg Fürth

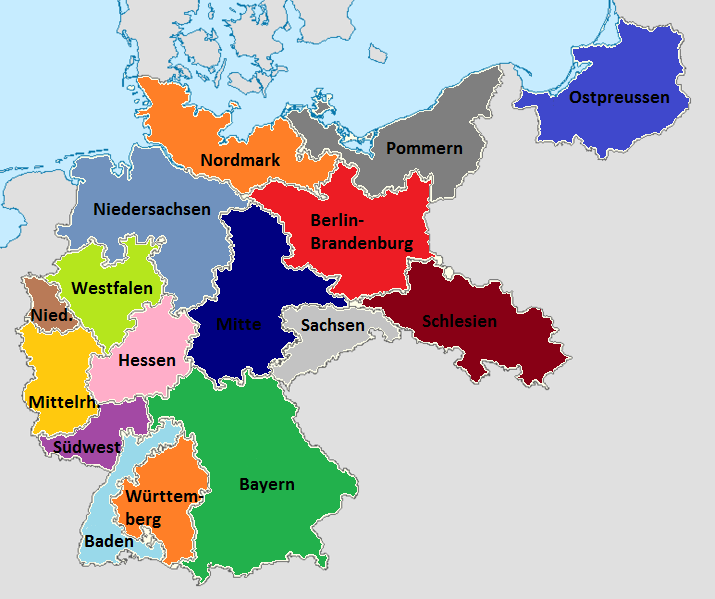
The initial 16 districts of the Gauliga with Bayern in green

The 1934–35 Gauliga Bayern was the second season of the league, one of the 16 Gauligas in Germany at the time. It was the first tier of the football league system in Bavaria (German:Bayern) from 1933 to 1945.

The league champions SpVgg Fürth qualified for the 1935 German football championship, where it finished second in its group, behind VfB Stuttgart, an ahead of FC Hanau 93 and SV Jena and was thereby knocked out of the competition. For Fürth it was the only Gauliga championships the club would win in the era from 1933 to 1944.

The 1934–35 season saw the introduction of a cup competition, the Tschammerpokal, now the DFB-Pokal. The inaugural 1935 edition was won by Gauliga Bayern runners-up 1. FC Nürnberg, defeating German champion FC Schalke 04 2–0 on 8 December 1935.

== Table ==
The 1934–35 season saw two new clubs in the league, BC Augsburg and SpVgg Weiden and operated with eleven teams, one less than the previous season.

Pos	Team	Pld	W	D	L	GF	GA	GD	Pts	Promotion, qualification or relegation
1	SpVgg Fürth (C)	20	12	4	4	38	21	+17	28	Qualification to German championship
2	1. FC Nürnberg	20	9	7	4	43	26	+17	25	
3	1. FC Schweinfurt 05	20	9	7	4	42	29	+13	25	
4	FC Bayern Munich	20	9	6	5	49	31	+18	24	
5	TSV 1860 München	20	8	5	7	36	30	+6	21	
6	FC Wacker München	20	7	4	9	36	38	−2	18	
7	ASV Nürnberg	20	6	5	9	31	41	−10	17	
8	BC Augsburg	20	6	5	9	34	46	−12	17	
9	SpVgg Weiden (R)	20	6	5	9	36	59	−23	17	Relegation
10	SSV Jahn Regensburg (R)	20	4	7	9	33	35	−2	15	Relegation
11	TSV Schwaben Augsburg (R)	20	4	5	11	31	53	−22	13	Relegation

Source: claudionicoletti.eu
Rules for classification: 1) Points
(C) Champions; (R) Relegated
