= Kitzinger =

Kitzinger is a surname. Notable people with the surname include:

- Albin Kitzinger (1912–1970), German football player
- Celia Kitzinger, British same-sex marriage activist
- Ernst Kitzinger (1912–2003), German-American art historian
- Sheila Kitzinger (1929–2015), British natural childbirth activist

== Fictional characters ==
- Jilly Kitzinger, a fictional character in the science fiction series Torchwood
