= 1937–38 Gauliga Bayern =

Gauliga Bayern
- Season: 1937–38
- Champions: 1. FC Nürnberg
- Relegated: FC Wacker München; VfB Ingolstadt-Ringsee
- German championship: 1. FC Nürnberg

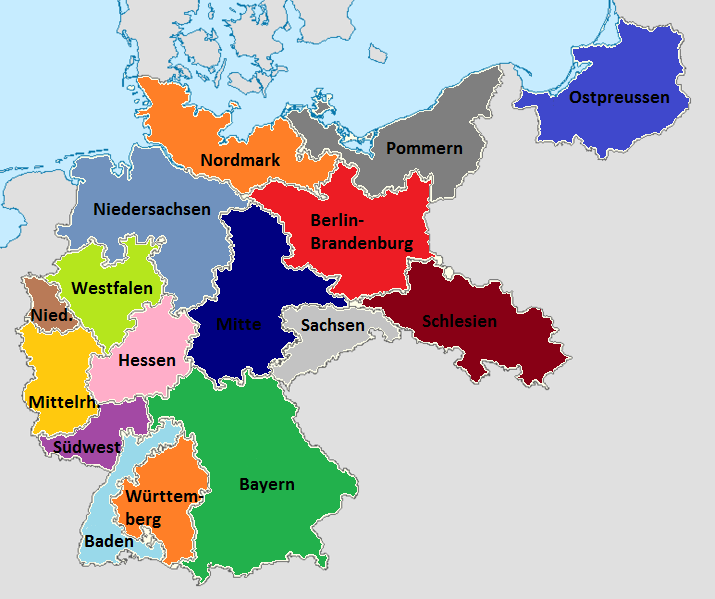
The initial 16 districts of the Gauliga with Bayern in green

The 1937–38 Gauliga Bayern was the fifth season of the league, one of the 16 Gauligas in Germany at the time. It was the first tier of the football league system in Bavaria (German:Bayern) from 1933 to 1945.

For 1. FC Nürnberg it was the fourth of seven Gauliga championships the club would win in the era from 1933 to 1944 and the third consecutive one. The club qualified for the 1938 German football championship, where it finished second in its group behind eventual champions Hannover 96, and ahead of Alemannia Aachen and FC Hanau 93.

The fourth edition of the Tschammerpokal, now the DFB-Pokal, saw 1. FC Nürnberg reach the semi-finals where it lost to eventual winners SK Rapid Wien, the best performance of a Gauliga Bayern club that season.

== Table ==
The 1937–38 season saw two clubs promoted to the league, SSV Jahn Regensburg and Schwaben Augsburg.

Pos	Team	Pld	W	D	L	GF	GA	GD	Pts	Promotion, qualification or relegation
1	1. FC Nürnberg (C)	18	11	5	2	35	16	+19	27	Qualification to German championship
2	TSV 1860 München	18	9	5	4	42	27	+15	23	
3	SSV Jahn Regensburg	18	9	4	5	34	24	+10	22	
4	SpVgg Fürth	18	9	4	5	38	33	+5	22	
5	FC Bayern Munich	18	8	3	7	37	29	+8	19	
6	BC Augsburg	18	6	5	7	26	27	−1	17	
7	1. FC Schweinfurt 05	18	7	3	8	29	40	−11	17	
8	Schwaben Augsburg	18	4	4	10	31	44	−13	12	
9	FC Wacker München (R)	18	4	3	11	25	32	−7	11	Relegation
10	VfB Ingolstadt-Ringsee (R)	18	4	2	12	15	40	−25	10	Relegation

Source: claudionicoletti.eu
Rules for classification: 1) Points
(C) Champions; (R) Relegated
