= Hans Pausch =

German footballer (born 1957)

Personal information
- Date of birth: 9 September 1957 (age 69)
- Place of birth: Weiden, West Germany
- Position: Defender

Senior career*
Years	Team	Apps	(Gls)
1977–1979	1. FC Nürnberg		
1979–1980	MTV Ingolstadt		
- * Club domestic league appearances and goals

Hans Pausch (born 9 September 1957) is a retired German football defender.
