= 1964 Torneo di Viareggio =

1964 Torneo Mondiale di Calcio Coppa Carnevale
16° Torneo di Viareggio

Tournament details
- Host country: Italy
- City: Viareggio
- Teams: 16

Final positions
- Champions: (Czechoslovakia) Dukla Praha
- Runners-up: (Italy) Bologna
- Third place: (Hungary) Ferencváros
- Fourth place: (Italy) Roma

Tournament statistics
- Matches played: 24
- Goals scored: 57 (2.38 per match)

The 1964 winners of the Torneo di Viareggio (in English, the Viareggio Tournament, officially the Viareggio Cup World Football Tournament Coppa Carnevale), the annual youth football tournament held in Viareggio, Tuscany, are listed below.

== Format ==
The 16 teams are organized in knockout rounds. The round of 16 are played in two-legs, while the rest of the rounds are single tie.

== Participating teams ==
Italian teams

- (Italy) Bologna
- (Italy) Fiorentina
- (Italy) Genoa
- (Italy) Inter Milan
- (Italy) Juventus
- (Italy) Milan
- (Italy) Roma
- (Italy) Sampdoria

European teams

- Austria Wien
- (Czechoslovakia) Dukla Praha
- (France) Toulon
- (Hungary) Ferencváros
- (Socialist Federal Republic of Yugoslavia) Partizan Beograd
- (Socialist Federal Republic of Yugoslavia) Rijeka
- (Belgium) Daring
- (West Germany) Augsburg

== Tournament fixtures ==
First round
(Italy) Bologna	1	0	1
(Socialist Federal Republic of Yugoslavia) Partizan Beograd	0	0	0
(Italy) Juventus	2	3	5
(France) Toulon	1	0	1
Austria Wien	0	1	1
(Italy) Roma	5	0	5
(Belgium) Daring	1	1	2
(Italy) Inter	4	3	7
(Czechoslovakia) Dukla Praha	2	2	4
(Italy) Genoa	2	1	3
(Italy) Fiorentina	3	1	4
(Socialist Federal Republic of Yugoslavia) Rijeka	1	0	1
(Hungary) Ferencváros	1	1	2
(Italy) Sampdoria	1	1	2
(West Germany) Augsburg	0	0	0
(Italy) Milan	2	4	6

Quarter-finals
(Italy) Bologna(pen)	0 [4]
(Italy) Juventus	0 [3]
(Italy) Roma(pen)	0 [5]
(Italy) Inter	0 [4]
(Czechoslovakia) Dukla Praha(pen)	0 [5]
(Italy) Fiorentina	0 [4]
(Hungary) Ferencváros	4
(Italy) Milan	0

Semi-finals
(Italy) Bologna(pen)	1 [6]
(Italy) Roma	1 [4]
(Czechoslovakia) Dukla Praha	2
(Hungary) Ferencváros	0

Final
(Italy) Bologna	0
(Czechoslovakia) Dukla Praha	2
Third place
(Italy) Roma	1
(Hungary) Ferencváros	2

== Champions ==
Torneo di Viareggio 1964 champions
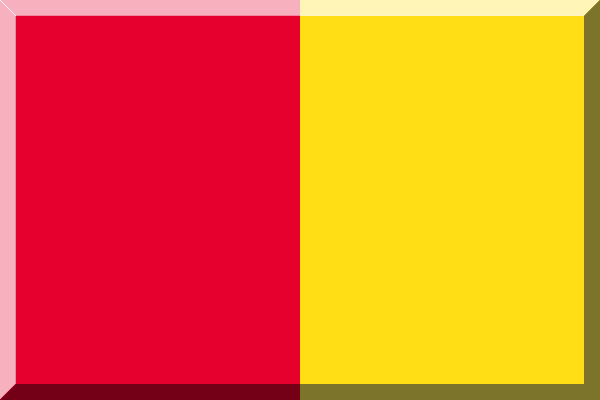
Dukla Praha
1st title
