= 1936–37 Gauliga Bayern =

Gauliga Bayern
- Season: 1936–37
- Champions: 1. FC Nürnberg
- Relegated: ASV Nürnberg; VfB Coburg
- German championship: 1. FC Nürnberg

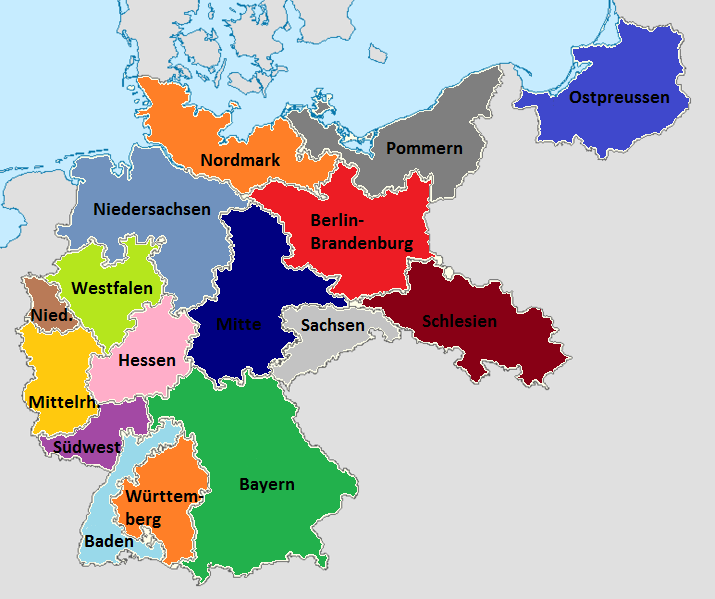
The initial 16 districts of the Gauliga with Bayern in green

The 1936–37 Gauliga Bayern was the fourth season of the league, one of the 16 Gauligas in Germany at the time. It was the first tier of the football league system in Bavaria (German:Bayern) from 1933 to 1945.

For 1. FC Nürnberg it was the third of seven Gauliga championships the club would win in the era from 1933 to 1944. The club qualified for the 1937 German football championship, where it finished first in its group with Fortuna Düsseldorf, Waldhof Mannheim and VfR Köln and qualified for the semi-finals. After overcoming Hamburger SV 3–2 Nürnberg advanced to the final where it lost 2–0 to FC Schalke 04.

In the third edition of the Tschammerpokal, now the DFB-Pokal, saw the Gauliga Bayern representatives knocked out early with the SpVgg Fürth achieving the best result, reaching the third round.

== Table ==
The 1936–37 season saw two new clubs in the league, VfB Ingolstadt-Ringsee and VfB Coburg.

Pos	Team	Pld	W	D	L	GF	GA	GD	Pts	Promotion, qualification or relegation
1	1. FC Nürnberg (C)	18	13	1	4	47	16	+31	27	Qualification to German championship
2	1. FC Schweinfurt 05	18	11	2	5	44	29	+15	24	
3	FC Bayern Munich	18	8	4	6	49	31	+18	20	
4	SpVgg Fürth	18	8	2	8	29	35	−6	18	
5	BC Augsburg	18	6	4	8	26	31	−5	16	
6	VfB Ingolstadt-Ringsee	18	6	4	8	28	38	−10	16	
7	TSV 1860 München	18	7	2	9	27	38	−11	16	
8	FC Wacker München	18	4	7	7	21	24	−3	15	
9	ASV Nürnberg (R)	18	6	3	9	31	39	−8	15	Relegation
10	VfB Coburg (R)	18	4	5	9	26	47	−21	13	Relegation

Source: claudionicoletti.eu
Rules for classification: 1) Points
(C) Champions; (R) Relegated
