= 1940–41 Gauliga Bayern =

Gauliga Bayern
- Season: 1940–41
- Champions: TSV 1860 München
- Relegated: VfR 07 Schweinfurt; Würzburger Kickers
- German championship: TSV 1860 München

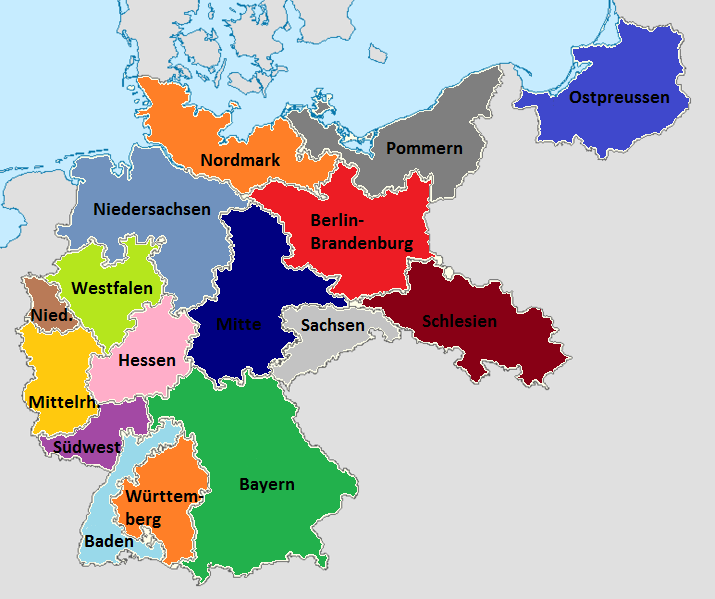
The initial 16 districts of the Gauliga with Bayern in green

The 1940–41 Gauliga Bayern was the eighth season of the league, one of the 20 Gauligas in Germany at the time. It was the first tier of the football league system in Bavaria (German:Bayern) from 1933 to 1945.

For TSV 1860 München it was the first of two Gauliga championships the club would win in the era from 1933 to 1944. The club qualified for the 1941 German football championship, where it was knocked out after finishing second in its group. They were placed behind the group winner and eventual German champions SK Rapid Wien, and ahead of Stuttgarter Kickers and VfL Neckarau.

The seventh edition of the Tschammerpokal, now the DFB-Pokal, saw 1. FC Nürnberg as the best Gauliga Bayern club reach the third round, having reached the final in the previous two editions.

== Table ==
The 1940–41 season saw three new clubs in the league, Schwaben Augsburg, FC Wacker München and Würzburger Kickers. The league originally started with 13 clubs but TSV 1883 Nürnberg which had played as FSV Nürnberg in the previous season, withdrew during the season.

Pos	Team	Pld	W	D	L	GF	GA	GD	Pts	Promotion, qualification or relegation
1	TSV 1860 München (C)	22	17	1	4	83	30	+53	35	Qualification to German championship
2	1. FC Nürnberg	22	14	3	5	52	24	+28	31	
3	BC Augsburg	22	12	5	5	44	32	+12	29	
4	SpVgg Fürth	22	11	5	6	63	45	+18	27	
5	SSV Jahn Regensburg	22	11	3	8	45	36	+9	25	
6	BSG WKG Neumeyer Nürnberg	22	9	5	8	44	34	+10	23	
7	1. FC Schweinfurt 05	22	8	5	9	38	32	+6	21	
8	FC Bayern Munich	22	8	4	10	35	35	0	20	
9	Schwaben Augsburg	22	7	5	10	45	51	−6	19	
10	FC Wacker München	22	6	4	12	35	60	−25	16	
11	VfR 07 Schweinfurt (R)	22	4	3	15	24	64	−40	11	Relegation
12	Würzburger Kickers (R)	22	2	3	17	22	87	−65	7	Relegation

Source: claudionicoletti.eu
Rules for classification: 1) Points;
(C) Champions; (R) Relegated
