= 1942–43 Gauliga Bayern =

Gauliga Bayern
- Season: 1942–43
- Champions: North: 1. FC Nürnberg; South: TSV 1860 München
- Relegated: North: Reichsbahn/Viktoria Aschaffenburg; FC Eintracht/Franken Nürnberg; Post SG Fürth; South: SC Bajuwaren München; VfB München
- German championship: 1. FC Nürnberg; TSV 1860 München

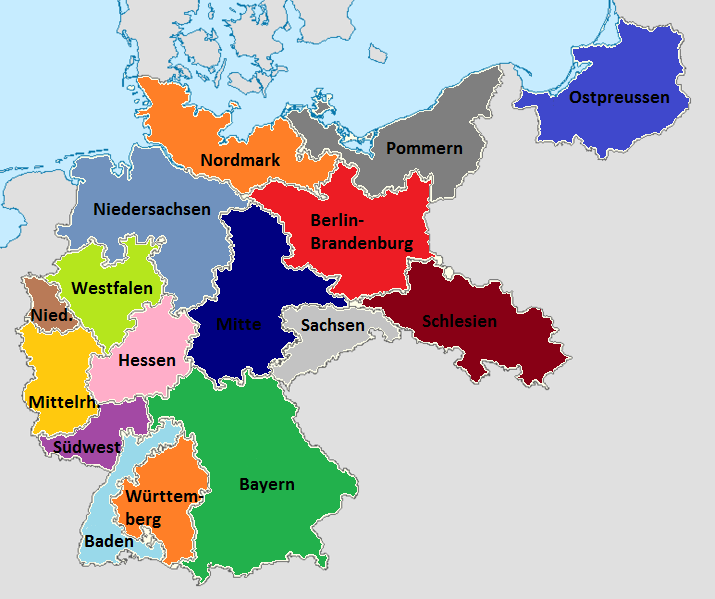
The initial 16 districts of the Gauliga with Bayern in green

The 1942–43 Gauliga Bayern was the tenth season of the league, one of the 29 Gauligas in Germany at the time. It was the first tier of the football league system in Bavaria (German:Bayern) from 1933 to 1945. It was the first season of the league being sub-divided into a northern and southern division, the Gauliga Nordbayern and Gauliga Südbayern.

For TSV 1860 München it was the second of two Gauliga championships while, for 1. FC Nürnberg, it was the sixth out of seven the club would win in the era from 1933 to 1944. Both clubs qualified for the 1943 German football championship, where Nürnberg was knocked out in the first preliminary round after losing 3–1 to VfR Mannheim while TSV 1860 lost 2–0 to First Vienna in the quarter-finals.

The ninth edition of the Tschammerpokal, now the DFB-Pokal, saw 1. FC Nürnberg eliminated by First Vienna in the quarter-finals as the best Gauliga Bayern club.

== Table ==
=== North ===
The 1942–43 season saw five new clubs in the league, 1. FC Bamberg, Würzburger Kickers, VfR 07 Schweinfurt, Reichsbahn/Viktoria Aschaffenburg and Post SG Fürth.

Pos	Team	Pld	W	D	L	GF	GA	GD	Pts	Promotion, qualification or relegation
1	1. FC Nürnberg (C)	20	20	0	0	125	17	+108	40	Qualification to German championship
2	1. FC Schweinfurt 05	20	16	0	4	85	21	+64	32	
3	SpVgg Fürth	20	14	1	5	81	33	+48	29	
4	Reichsbahn SG Weiden	20	13	1	6	47	44	+3	27	
5	VfL Nürnberg (Note: BSG WKG Neumeyer Nürnberg changed its name to VfL Nürnberg before the start of the season)	20	8	3	9	49	54	−5	19	
6	1. FC Bamberg	20	8	1	11	50	54	−4	17	
7	Würzburger Kickers	20	6	2	12	38	73	−35	14	
8	VfR 07 Schweinfurt	20	5	2	13	28	53	−25	12	
9	Reichsbahn/Viktoria Aschaffenburg (R)	20	5	2	13	38	76	−38	12	Relegation
10	FC Eintracht/Franken Nürnberg (R)	20	4	3	13	26	94	−68	11	Relegation
11	Post SG Fürth (R)	20	3	1	16	25	73	−48	7	Relegation

Source: claudionicoletti.eu
Rules for classification: 1) Points
(C) Champions; (R) Relegated

=== South ===
The 1942–43 season saw four new clubs in the league, LSV Straubing, TSG Augsburg, FC Bajuwaren München and VfB München.

Pos	Team	Pld	W	D	L	GF	GA	GD	Pts	Promotion, qualification or relegation
1	TSV 1860 München (C)	18	16	1	1	103	15	+88	33	Qualification to German championship
2	BC Augsburg	18	13	3	2	53	20	+33	29	
3	FC Bayern Munich	18	10	2	6	52	23	+29	22	
4	Schwaben Augsburg	18	6	5	7	30	33	−3	17	
5	SSV Jahn Regensburg	18	8	1	9	30	48	−18	17	
6	FC Wacker München	18	7	2	9	47	44	+3	16	
7	LSV Straubing	18	7	1	10	32	65	−33	15	
8	TSG Augsburg	18	6	1	11	35	65	−30	13	
9	SC Bajuwaren München (R)	18	5	2	11	33	62	−29	12	Relegation
10	VfB München (R)	18	3	0	15	35	75	−40	6	Relegation

Source: claudionicoletti.eu
Rules for classification: 1) Points
(C) Champions; (R) Relegated
