= Regionalliga Süd (1963–1974) =

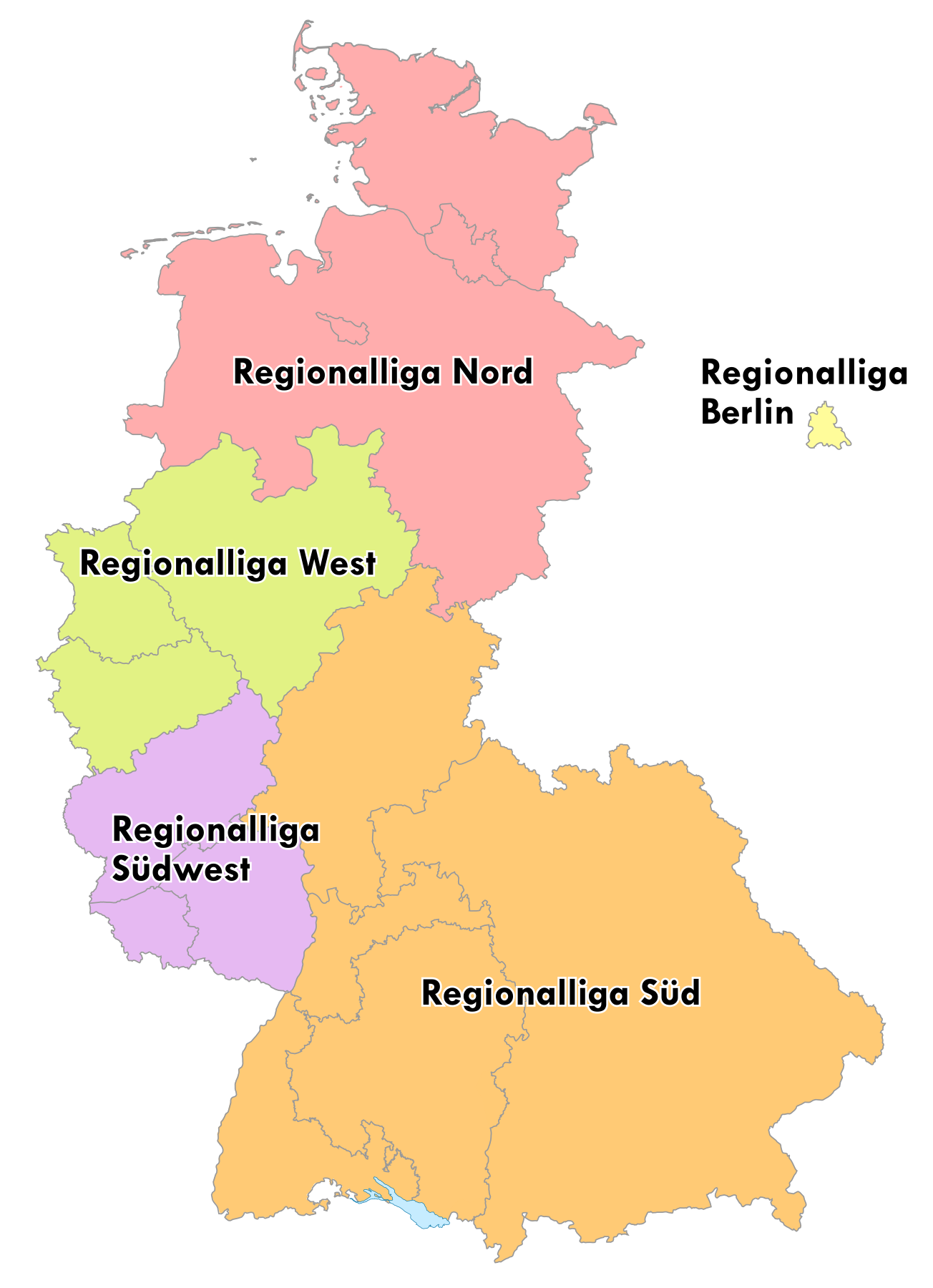
- Founded: 1963
- Folded: 1974 (11 seasons)
- Replaced by: 2. Bundesliga Süd
- Country: West Germany
- States: Bavaria; Baden-Württemberg; Hesse
- Level on pyramid: Level 2
- Promotion to: Bundesliga
- Relegation to: Amateurliga Bayern; Amateurliga Hessen; Amateurliga Nordbaden; Amateurliga Südbaden; Amateurliga Württemberg; Amateurliga Schwarzwald-Bodensee
- Last champions: FC Augsburg (1973–74)

The Regionalliga Süd was the second-highest level of the German football league system. It existed in the south of West Germany from 1963 until the formation of the 2. Bundesliga in 1974. It covered the three states of Bavaria, Baden-Württemberg and Hesse.

== Overview ==
The league started out in 1963 with 20 clubs which were reduced for the next season to 19. From 1965 to 1974, there were always 18 teams in the league, except in 1972 when another season of 19 clubs was played.

It was formed from the eleven clubs of the Oberliga Süd which did not get admitted to the new Bundesliga and from the top nine clubs of the 2. Oberliga Süd. The Regionalliga Süd was as such a continuation of the Oberliga Süd under a different name and a tier lower.

Along with the Regionalliga Süd went another four Regionalligas, these five formed the second tier of German football until 1974:

- Regionalliga Nord, covering the states of Niedersachsen, Schleswig-Holstein, Bremen and Hamburg
- Regionalliga West, covering the state of Nordrhein-Westfalen
- Regionalliga Berlin, covering West-Berlin
- Regionalliga Südwest, covering the states of Rheinland-Pfalz and Saarland

The new Regionalligas were formed along the borders of the old post-World War II Oberligas, not after a balanced regional system. Therefore, the Oberligas Berlin and West covered small but populous areas while Nord and Süd covered large areas. Südwest was something of an anachronism, neither large nor populous.

The league contained some big names of German Football, having the FC Bayern Munich, Kickers Offenbach and SpVgg Fürth as its founder members. In later years, clubs like TSV 1860 Munich, 1. FC Nürnberg and Karlsruher SC found themselves relegated to the league. The league posed something of a death trap for the big names of southern German football, as only the FC Bayern Munich and Kickers Offenbach achieved promotion from it. Kickers Offenbach also managed to win the German Cup in 1970, while still a Regionalliga side, the only club to do so.

The FC Schweinfurt 05, SpVgg Fürth, Stuttgarter Kickers, KSV Hessen Kassel, Freiburger FC and FC Bayern Hof all played in the league for the duration of its 11-season existence. Of those six, the Stuttgarter Kickers had the longest unbroken run in the second division, from 1960 to 1988, 28 seasons.

The winners and runners-up of this league were admitted to the promotion play-off to the Bundesliga, which was staged in two groups of originally four, later five teams each with the winner of each group going up.

The bottom three, some years four teams were relegated to the Amateurligas. Below the Regionalliga Süd were the following Amateurligas:

- Amateurliga Bayern
- Amateurliga Hessen
- Amateurliga Nordwürttemberg
- Amateurliga Schwarzwald-Bodensee
- Amateurliga Nordbaden
- Amateurliga Südbaden

== Disbanding of the Regionalliga Süd ==
The league was dissolved in 1974. According to their performance of the last couple of seasons, 13 clubs of the Regionalliga went to the new 2. Bundesliga Süd. The five remaining clubs were relegated to the Amateurligas.

The teams admitted to the 2. Bundesliga Süd were:

- FC Augsburg (champions)
- 1. FC Nürnberg (runners-up)
- 1860 Munich (3rd)
- Darmstadt 98 (4th)
- SpVgg Bayreuth (5th)
- Stuttgarter Kickers (6th)
- SV Waldhof Mannheim (7th)
- Karlsruher SC (8th)
- FC Bayern Hof (9th)
- SpVgg Fürth (10th)
- VfR Heilbronn (12th)
- VfR Mannheim (13th)
- FC Schweinfurt 05 (15th)

The following teams were relegated to the Amateurligas:

- FSV Frankfurt (11th) – Amateurliga Hessen
- VfR Bürstadt (14th) – Amateurliga Hessen
- Hessen Kassel (16th) – Amateurliga Hessen
- Freiburger FC (17th) – Amateurliga Südbaden
- Jahn Regensburg (18th) – Amateurliga Bayern

== Qualifying to the 2. Bundesliga ==
From the Regionalliga Süd, 13 clubs qualified for the new 2. Bundesliga Süd, together with seven teams from the Südwest region.

The qualifying modus saw the last five seasons counted, whereby the last placed team in each season received one point, the second-last two points and so on. For a Bundesliga season within this five-year period, a club received 25 points, for an Amateurliga season none.

For the seasons 1969–70 and 70–71, the received points counted single, for the 71–72 and 72–73 season double and for the 73–74 season three times.

To be considered in the points table for the new league, a club had to play either in the Regionalliga Süd in 1973–74 or to have been relegated from the Bundesliga to it for the next season, something which did not apply to the league that year.

The bottom three clubs in the league, nominally the relegated teams in a normal season, were barred from entry to the 2. Bundesliga, regardless of where they stood in the points ranking. This fact saved the FC Augsburg, the last league champion, from relegation, as Hessen Kassel, placed ninth overall but having finished 16th in 1973–74 was barred from promotion, opening the way for FCA.

Points table:

| Rank | Club | Points (1969–1974) | Position in 1973–74 |
|---|---|---|---|
| 1 | 1860 Munich | 155 | 3 |
| 2 | 1. FC Nürnberg | 138 | 2 |
| 3 | Karlsruher SC | 134 | 8 |
| 4 | Darmstadt 98 | 110 | 4 |
| 5 | FC Bayern Hof | 104 | 9 |
| 6 | Stuttgarter Kickers | 98 | 6 |
| 7 | SpVgg Bayreuth | 90 | 5 |
| 8 | VfR Heilbronn | 90 | 12 |
| 9 | Hessen Kassel ^{1} | 90 | 16 |
| 10 | SpVgg Fürth | 85 | 10 |
| 11 | FC Schweinfurt 05 | 68 | 15 |
| 12 | Freiburger FC ^{1} | 68 | 17 |
| 13 | SV Waldhof Mannheim | 61 | 7 |
| 14 | FC Augsburg | 54 | 1 |
| 15 | Jahn Regensburg ^{1} | 53 | 18 |
| 16 | VfR Mannheim | 28 | 13 |
| 17 | VfR Bürstadt | 27 | 14 |
| 18 | FSV Frankfurt | 26 | 11 |

- Source: DSFS Liga-Chronik (in German), page: C4, accessed: 18 March 2009
- Bold teams are promoted to the 2nd Bundesliga.
- ^{1} Barred from gaining access to the 2. Bundesliga due to having finished on a relegation spot.

== Re-formation of the Regionalliga Süd ==
The Regionalliga Süd was reformed in 1994, now as the third tier of the German football league system, again covering the three southern German states of Bayern, Baden-Württemberg and Hessen. In something of a repeat of history, the clubs from the Oberliga Südwest merged into the league in 2000. The Regionalliga Süd now roughly covered the same area as the 2nd Bundesliga Süd did from 1974 to 1981. In 2008, the Südwest clubs will leave the league again and join the new Regionalliga West and the Regionalliga Süd will revert to its coverage of the three original regions, but now as the fourth tier of the league system, below the new 3. Liga.

== Winners and runners-up of the Regionalliga Süd ==
The winners and runners–up of the league were:

| **Season** | **Winners** | **Runners–up** |
| 1963–64 | Hessen Kassel | Bayern Munich |
| 1964–65 | **Bayern Munich** | SSV Reutlingen |
| 1965–66 | FC Schweinfurt 05 | Kickers Offenbach |
| 1966–67 | Kickers Offenbach | FC Bayern Hof |
| 1967–68 | FC Bayern Hof | **Kickers Offenbach** |
| 1968–69 | Karlsruher SC | Freiburger FC |
| 1969–70 | **Kickers Offenbach** | Karlsruher SC |
| 1970–71 | 1. FC Nürnberg | Karlsruher SC |
| 1971–72 | **Kickers Offenbach** | FC Bayern Hof |
| 1972–73 | Darmstadt 98 | Karlsruher SC |
| 1973–74 | FC Augsburg | 1. FC Nürnberg |

- **Bold** denotes team went on to gain promotion to the Bundesliga.
- In 1970, Kickers Offenbach won the German Cup as a Regionalliga team, the only one to do so. They are also the only club to have won the league more than once, having done so three times.
- In 1974, FC Augsburg won the Regionalliga being freshly promoted from the Amateurliga Bayern.
- Of the nine different winners of the Regionalliga Süd from 1964 to 1974, four have done so again in the new Regionalliga Süd: FC Augsburg, Karlsruher SC, 1. FC Nürnberg and, for a record fourth time, Kickers Offenbach in 2005.

== Placings in the Regionalliga Süd 1963 to 1974 ==
The league placings from 1963 to 1974:

| Club | 64 | 65 | 66 | 67 | 68 | 69 | 70 | 71 | 72 | 73 | 74 |
|---|---|---|---|---|---|---|---|---|---|---|---|
| Bayern Munich | 2 | 1 | B | B | B | B | B | B | B | B | B |
| Kickers Offenbach | 3 | 3 | 2 | 1 | 2 | B | 1 | B | 1 | B | B |
| FC Augsburg | | | | | | | | | | | 1 |
| 1. FC Nürnberg | B | B | B | B | B | B | 3 | 1 | 9 | 5 | 2 |
| 1860 Munich | B | B | B | B | B | B | B | 4 | 3 | 3 | 3 |
| Darmstadt 98 | | 14 | 13 | 14 | 14 | 8 | 18 | | 7 | 1 | 4 |
| SpVgg Bayreuth | | | | | | | 17 | | 13 | 4 | 5 |
| Stuttgarter Kickers | 14 | 7 | 5 | 4 | 4 | 4 | 12 | 10 | 11 | 8 | 6 |
| SV Waldhof Mannheim | 11 | 4 | 3 | 11 | 12 | 11 | 20 | | | 7 | 7 |
| Karlsruher SC | B | B | B | B | B | 1 | 2 | 2 | 5 | 2 | 8 |
| FC Bayern Hof | 13 | 9 | 9 | 2 | 1 | 3 | 4 | 13 | 2 | 12 | 9 |
| SpVgg Fürth | 9 | 8 | 4 | 3 | 7 | 7 | 8 | 7 | 14 | 9 | 10 |
| FSV Frankfurt | 16 | 10 | 14 | 13 | 16 | | 19 | | | | 11 |
| VfR Heilbronn | | | | | | | 14 | 8 | 8 | 6 | 12 |
| VfR Mannheim | 6 | 6 | 12 | 5 | 6 | 14 | 15 | 16 | | | 13 |
| VfR Bürstadt | | | | | | | | | | 13 | 14 |
| FC Schweinfurt 05 | 7 | 15 | 1 | 10 | 5 | 6 | 5 | 6 | 12 | 14 | 15 |
| KSV Hessen Kassel | 1 | 5 | 6 | 8 | 8 | 10 | 7 | 3 | 4 | 10 | 16 |
| Freiburger FC | 10 | 11 | 15 | 7 | 9 | 2 | 6 | 9 | 6 | 15 | 17 |
| SSV Jahn Regensburg | | | | | 15 | 5 | 10 | 5 | 16 | 11 | 18 |
| SpVgg Ludwigsburg | | | | | | | | | 15 | 16 | |
| SSV Reutlingen | 5 | 2 | 8 | 6 | 3 | 9 | 11 | 15 | 10 | 17 | |
| FC Wacker München | | 17 | | | | | | 19 | | 18 | |
| Opel Rüsselsheim | | | 10 | 12 | 11 | 15 | 13 | 14 | 17 | | |
| FC 08 Villingen | | | | 15 | 10 | 13 | 9 | 12 | 18 | | |
| ESV Ingolstadt | 12 | 12 | 16 | | | 12 | 16 | 11 | 19 | | |
| 1. Göppinger SV | | | | | | | | 17 | | | |
| Viktoria Aschaffenburg | | | | | | | | 18 | | | |
| VfL Neckarau | | | | | | 16 | | | | | |
| TSV Schwaben Augsburg | 4 | 16 | 11 | 9 | 13 | 17 | | | | | |
| Rot-Weiß Frankfurt | | | | | | 18 | | | | | |
| TSG Backnang | | | | | 17 | | | | | | |
| SV Wiesbaden | | | | | 18 | | | | | | |
| BC Augsburg | 19 | | | 16 | | | | | | | |
| Germania Wiesbaden | | | | 17 | | | | | | | |
| 1. FC Pforzheim | 15 | 13 | 7 | 18 | | | | | | | |
| SpVgg Weiden | | | 17 | | | | | | | | |
| VfR Pforzheim | | | 18 | | | | | | | | |
| TSG Ulm 1846 | 8 | 18 | | | | | | | | | |
| FC Emmendingen | | 19 | | | | | | | | | |
| SpVgg Neu-Isenburg | 17 | | | | | | | | | | |
| Borussia Fulda | 18 | | | | | | | | | | |
| Amicitia Viernheim | 20 | | | | | | | | | | |

Source:"Regionalliga Süd". Das deutsche Fussball-Archiv.

=== Key ===
| Symbol | Key |
|---|---|
| B | Bundesliga |
| Place | League |
| Blank | Played at a league level below this league |

== Top scorers ==
The league's top scorers:

| Season | Player(s) | Club(s) | Goals |
|---|---|---|---|
| 1963–64 | Jendrosch | Hessen Kassel | 34 |
| 1964–65 | Rainer Ohlhauser | Bayern Munich | 42 |
| 1965–66 | Mikulasch | ESV Ingolstadt | 29 |
| 1966–67 | Windhausen | SpVgg Fürth | 32 |
| 1967–68 | Breuer | FC Bayern Hof | 27 |
| 1967–68 | Schäffner | VfR Mannheim | 27 |
| 1968–69 | Klier | FC 08 Villingen | 23 |
| 1969–70 | Klier | FC 08 Villingen | 22 |
| 1970–71 | Bründl | Stuttgarter Kickers | 21 |
| 1971–72 | Erwin Kostedde | Kickers Offenbach | 27 |
| 1972–73 | Keller | 1860 Munich | 26 |
| 1973–74 | Obermeier | FC Augsburg | 25 |

Source:100 Jahre Süddeutscher Fussball-Verband. Vindelica Verlag. 1997. p. 172.

== Records ==
The league records:

| Biggest win | 11–0 | Kickers Offenbach 11–0 VfR Pforzheim (19 September 1965) |
| Most goals in a game | 13 | Freiburger FC 2–11 Bayern Munich (7 February 1965) |
| Season with most goals | 1,255 (3,67 per game) | 1964–65 |
| Round with most goals | 49 (5,44 per game) | Round 19, 1964–65 |

== All-time table ==
The best and worst teams in the all-time table of the league from 1963 to 1974:

| Pos. | Club | Seasons | Pld | W | D | L | GF | GA | Pts |
|---|---|---|---|---|---|---|---|---|---|
| 1 | FC Bayern Hof | 11 | 388 | 183 | 81 | 124 | 761 | 554 | 447 |
| 2 | KSV Hessen Kassel | 11 | 388 | 166 | 89 | 133 | 733 | 609 | 421 |
| 3 | Stuttgarter Kickers | 11 | 388 | 164 | 87 | 137 | 709 | 619 | 415 |
| 4–41 | 38 clubs | | | | | | | | |
| 42 | FC Emmendingen | 1 | 36 | 1 | 2 | 33 | 31 | 159 | 4 |
