= 1941–42 Gauliga Bayern =

Gauliga Bayern
- Season: 1941–42
- Champions: 1. FC Schweinfurt 05
- Relegated: none
- German championship: 1. FC Schweinfurt 05

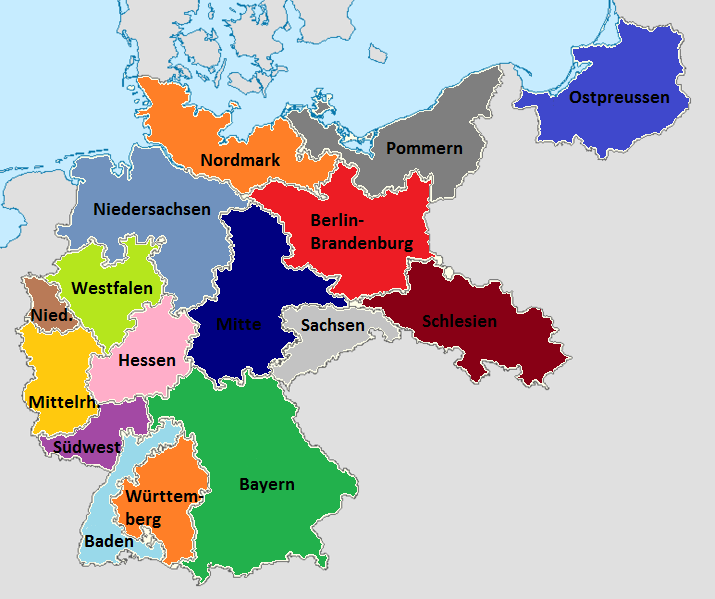
The initial 16 districts of the Gauliga with Bayern in green

The 1941–42 Gauliga Bayern was the ninth season of the league, one of the 25 Gauligas in Germany at the time. It was the first tier of the football league system in Bavaria (German:Bayern) from 1933 to 1945. It was the last season of the league played in the single division format with the Gauliga Bayern being sub-divided into north and south in the following edition.

For 1. FC Schweinfurt 05 it was the second of two Gauliga championships the club would win in the era from 1933 to 1944. The club qualified for the 1942 German football championship, where it was knocked out in the intermediate stage after losing 2–1 to SG SS Strassburg.

The eighth edition of the Tschammerpokal, now the DFB-Pokal, was won by Gauliga Bayern club TSV 1860 München who defeated German champions FC Schalke 04 2–0 in the final.

== Table ==
The 1941–42 season saw two new clubs in the league, FC Eintracht/Franken Nürnberg and Reichsbahn SG Weiden.

Pos	Team	Pld	W	D	L	GF	GA	GD	Pts	Promotion, qualification or relegation
1	1. FC Schweinfurt 05 (C)	22	17	2	3	77	26	+51	36	Qualification to German championship
2	SpVgg Fürth	22	15	3	4	79	27	+52	33	
3	TSV 1860 München	22	15	2	5	81	27	+54	32	
4	1. FC Nürnberg	22	14	1	7	64	33	+31	29	
5	FC Wacker München	22	11	6	5	43	34	+9	28	
6	BC Augsburg	22	8	7	7	46	41	+5	23	
7	BSG WKG Neumeyer Nürnberg	22	10	2	10	50	47	+3	22	
8	FC Bayern Munich	21	7	3	11	41	40	+1	17	
9	Schwaben Augsburg	22	6	3	13	45	54	−9	15	
10	SSV Jahn Regensburg	22	5	5	12	37	78	−41	15	
11	FC Eintracht/Franken Nürnberg	22	2	4	16	27	108	−81	8	
12	Reichsbahn SG Weiden	21	1	2	18	33	108	−75	4	

Source: claudionicoletti.eu
Rules for classification: 1) Points
(C) Champions
