= MTV Ingolstadt =

German sports club

- Full name: Männer-Turn-Verein von 1881 Ingolstadt
- Founded: 1881
- Ground: MTV-Stadion am Kreuztor
- Capacity: 8,000
- Chairman: Gerhard Bonschab
- League: A-Klasse Donau/Isar 2 (IX)
- 2017–18: 6th
Home colours	Away colours

The Männer-Turn-Verein von 1881 Ingolstadt or Men's Gymnastics Club of 1881 Ingolstadt is a general sports club in Ingolstadt, Bavaria. It was founded on 18 July 1881.

Until 2004, the club operated a football department but after a merger with local rival ESV Ingolstadt to form FC Ingolstadt 04 the footballers left for the new club. After a break of a number of years, MTV has returned to competitive football, restarting at the lowest possible level, the C-Klasse, in 2009.

== History ==
=== Early years ===
While the club was formed in 1881, it did not begin to play football until 1905. In a Germany-wide split between gymnastics clubs and their football departments in 1924, the footballers became independent but this was revoked in 1933.

In the pre-Second World War days, the club lacked behind its local rival VfB Ingolstadt-Ringsee, the later ESV. While VfB at times played in the tier-one Bezirksliga Bayern, and later the Gauliga Bayern, MTV could not archive such heights until 1943, when a joined wartime side, the KSG Ingolstadt, briefly existed.

=== Post-Second World War ===
After World War II occupying Allied authorities ordered the dissolution of all organizations in Germany, including sporting associations. The club was re-founded as Städtischer SV Ingolstadt 1881 (English: City Sports Club Ingolstadt 1881). Their original name was restored in 1948.

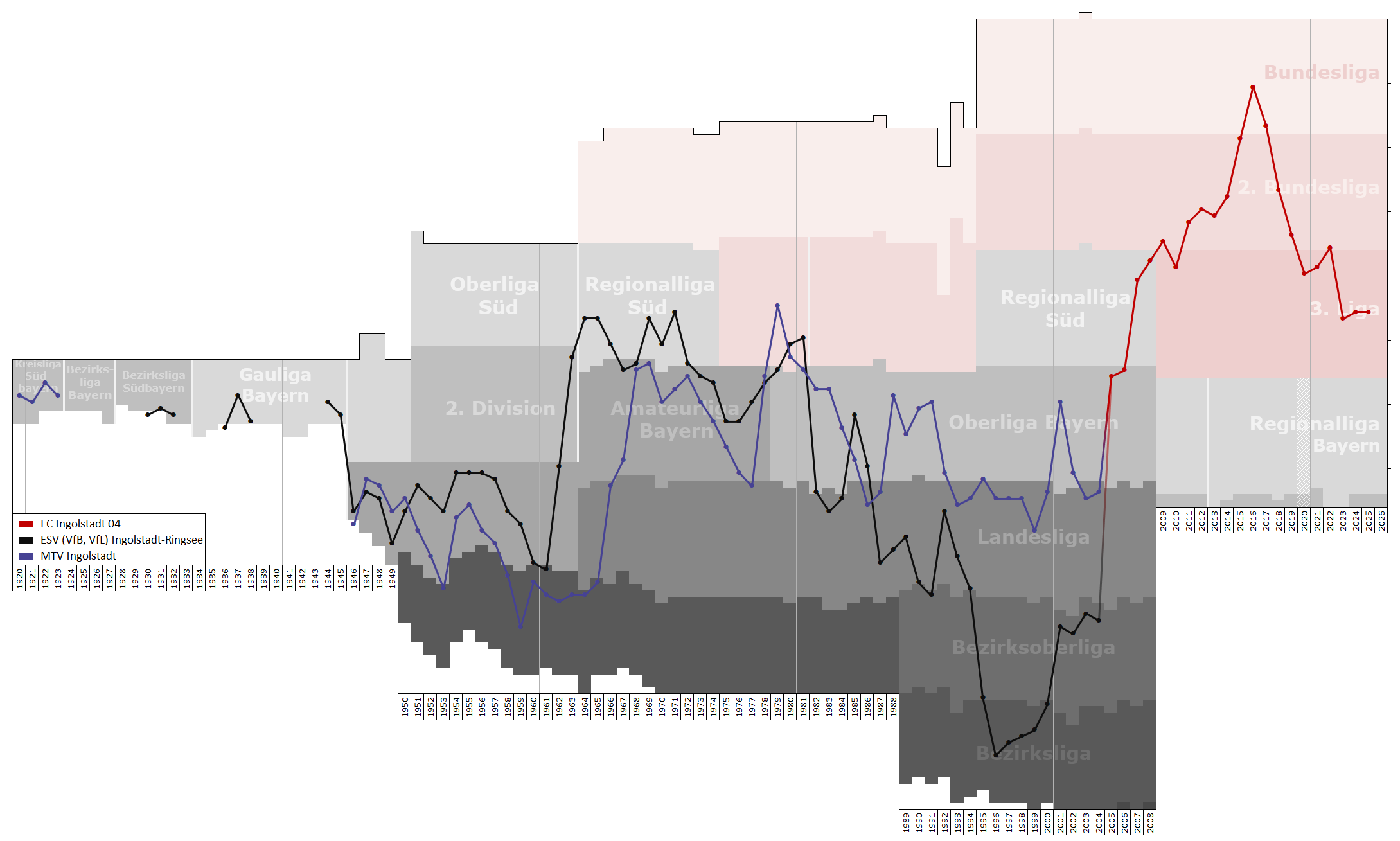
Historical chart of Ingolstadt league performance

The club qualified for the Landesliga Bayern (II) in 1946, where VfB already played. The league had restarted a year earlier as the tier below the Oberliga Süd. The league was then split into a northern and a southern group and MTV finished fourth out of eleven teams in the south. A repeat of this performance in the 1947–48 season meant, the team qualified for the now united Bavarian league. The club continued as a mid-table side in this league, but in 1951–52, the league had now been renamed Amateurliga Bayern and become a tier-three league, it was relegated after finishing 15th.

After initially failing to earn promotion from the 2. Amateurliga (IV) in 1953, the decision to return to two regional divisions for the Amateurliga Bayern meant, the MTV received one of the additional spots in the expanded league. In the following seasons, the team declined year-by-year and in 1957, it suffered another relegation from the Amateurliga. ESV followed MTV in this direction in 1960. But while ESV promptly returned and even marched through to the 2. Oberliga Süd, MTV failed to return to the Amateurliga Bayern.

=== 1963 to 1978 ===
The changes in the German football league system in 1963, foremost the introduction of the Bundesliga, saw the Bavarian football league system change, too. Below the Amateurliga Bayern, three regional Landesligen were formed. In the south, where MTV belonged to, the Landesliga Bayern-Süd was established, but the club failed to qualify for it and instead slipped down to the Bezirksliga Oberbayern-Nord (V), well below the clubs potential.

It recovered from this in 1965 and earned promotion to the Landesliga. In the 1965–66 Landesliga season, it won the championship straight away and finally returned to the third division after a ten-year absence. MTV could not maintain its Amateurliga status, however and promptly returned to the Landesliga, symptomatic for a club that would remain an elevator side between those two leagues for the next forty years, until the merger.

After a second place in 1968, it won another Landesliga title in 1969 and returned to the Amateurliga. It remained at this level for eight seasons, initially with good results but then gradually declining.

It spent only one season, 1976–77, in the Landesliga before returning straight again to the Amateurliga Bayern.

In retrospect, the era from 1976 to 1981 was to be the club's most successful, with a Landesliga and a Bayernliga title and two seasons in the 2. Bundesliga Süd.

The team missed out on the championship in the Amateurliga Bayern in 1977–78 by one point to 1. FC Haßfurt. When Haßfurt decided for financial reasons not to take up its right for promotion, MTV was second in line and moved up to the 2. Bundesliga for 1978–79.

=== 2. Bundesliga years ===
In this league, the club's first season was a success, finishing eleventh out of twenty teams, six points clear of relegation. At the end of the season, ESV had won what was now renamed Amateur Oberliga Bayern and also earned promotion to the second tier. This meant, two clubs from Ingolstadt where to be in the league for 1979–80.

While ESV finished 17th out of 21 clubs and remained in the league for another season, MTV came 19th and missed out on survival by three points to FSV Frankfurt. The club had to return to the Bayernliga.

=== 1980 to 2004 ===
The 1980–81 season was to see the club's only Bavarian championship, winning the Bayernliga. Unfortunately, no promotion for any tier-three champions was available this season because the 2. Bundesliga was reduced to a single division from its previous two regional ones. MTV had to enter the German amateur football championship instead, a small consolation for the club. While beating BFC Preußen Berlin in the first round, the team lost to FC St. Pauli in the semi-finals and finished the season empty handed apart from its Bayernliga title.

With the influx of former Bavarian tier-two teams in 1981, the league gained in quality but also became much harder to win. MTV finished fourth in 1981–82 and 1982–83 but then once more declined and in 1985, was relegated to the Landesliga once more. The 1984–85 season was the last to see two teams from Ingolstadt in the Amateur Oberliga Bayern, ESV was relegated in 1986 and never managed to regain this level of play.

MTV spent two seasons in the Landesliga before returning in 1987, having to beat FC Memmingen and VfB Helmbrechts in a promotion round to do so. The club archived another fourth place in the Bayernliga in the following season and remained a strong side in the league until 1991. In 1991–92, it once more suffered relegation.

In 1994, the introduction of the Regionalliga Süd meant that the club had a chance for promotion even though it had only finished third in the Landesliga. By beating SpVgg Weiden 4–2 after extra time, it succeeded. It was also the last season the Ingolstadt derby was to be played in league football, ESV was relegated from the Landesliga for good that season. Back in the Bayernliga, a last place finish send the club straight down again.

For MTV, five Landesliga'seasons followed, an eighth place in 1999 being the low point. The season after, the club won another second place and once more gained promotion through beating SpVgg Bayreuth and SpVgg Landshut in a promotion round.

After a sixth place in its first year back, the club came 17th in 2002 and went down to the Landesliga for the sixth time since 1963.

MTV Ingolstadt bowed out of league football with a fourth Landesliga Bayern-Süd title in 2004, thereby earning promotion to the Bayernliga for what would be FC Ingolstadt 04, the merger club.

=== Merger in 2004 ===
On 5 February 2004, FC Ingolstadt 04 was formed out of the football departments of ESV and MTV. The two clubs however did not disappear, their other sports departments continue to exist. Peter Jackwerth, the first chairman of FCI 04 was the driving force behind the concentration of football in the city. On 23 April 2004, the new club held its first general meeting. The new club played its first match on 10 July 2004, a friendly against Borussia Mönchengladbach in front of over 4,000 spectators. While the first team of FCI took over MTV's place in the Oberliga Bayern (IV), the second team took up ESV's spot in the Bezirksoberliga Oberbayern (VI).

MTV itself did not field a senior football team any more for a number of years but it continued to operate a small youth department. Eventually, in 2009, the club reentered a senior team in the tier-thirteen C-Klasse Donau-Isar, won the league and earned promotion to the B-Klasse, followed by promotion to the A-Klasse a year later. After four seasons in the A-Klasse the club won promotion to the Kreisklasse in 2015. MTV dropped back to the A-Klasse in 2017 after losing all 26 games, thereby finishing last out of 14 teams.

ESV survived its insolvency, which it had to declare in July 2004 and which was one of the main reasons the new club was formed.

== Honours ==
The club's honours:

=== League ===
- Oberliga Bayern (III)
  - Champions: 1981
  - Runners-up: 1978
- Landesliga Bayern-Süd (IV)
  - Champions: (4) 1966, 1969, 1977, 2004
  - Runners-up: (2) 1968, 2000
- 2. Amateurliga Oberbayern A (IV)
  - Champions: 1953
- Bezirksliga Oberbayern-Nord (V)
  - Champions: 1965
  - Runners-up: 1964
- A-Klasse Donau/Isar 2 West (X)
  - Champions: 2015
- B-Klasse Donau-Isar 2 Nord (XII)
  - Champions: 2011
- C-Klasse Donau-Isar 2 Süd (XIII)
  - Champions: 2010

=== Cup ===
- Bavarian Cup
  - Runners-up: (2) 1947, 1950

=== Youth ===
- Bavarian Under 19 championship
  - Runners-up: (3) 1965, 2000, 2001
- Bavarian Under 15 championship
  - Runners-up: 2001

== Recent seasons ==
The recent season-by-season performance of the club:

Season	Division	Tier	Position
1994–95	Bayernliga	IV	18th ↓
1995–96	Landesliga Bayern-Süd	V	3rd
1996–97	Landesliga Bayern-Süd	V	3rd
1997–98	Landesliga Bayern-Süd	V	3rd
1998–99	Landesliga Bayern-Süd	V	8th
1999–2000	Landesliga Bayern-Süd	V	2nd ↑
2000–01	Bayernliga	IV	6th
2001–02	Bayernliga	IV	17th ↓
2002–03	Landesliga Bayern-Süd	V	3rd
2003–04	Landesliga Bayern-Süd	V	1st ↑
2004–09	inactive		
2009–10	C-Klasse Donau-Isar 2 Süd	XIII	1st ↑
2010–11	B-Klasse Donau-Isar 2 Nord	XII	1st ↑
2011–12	A-Klasse Donau/Isar 2 West	XI	8th
2012–13	A-Klasse Donau/Isar 2 West	X	7th
2013–14	A-Klasse Donau/Isar 3 West	X	11th
2014–15	A-Klasse Donau/Isar 2 West	X	1st ↑
2015–16	Kreisklasse Donau/Isar	IX	11th
2016–17	Kreisklasse Donau/Isar	IX	14th ↓
2017–18	A-Klasse Donau/Isar 2 West	X	6th
2018–19	A-Klasse Donau/Isar 2 West	X	

- With the introduction of the Bezirksoberligas in 1988 as the new fifth tier, below the Landesligas, all leagues below dropped one tier. With the introduction of the Regionalligas in 1994 and the 3. Liga in 2008 as the new third tier, below the 2. Bundesliga, all leagues below dropped one tier. With the establishment of the Regionalliga Bayern as the new fourth tier in Bavaria in 2012 the Bayernliga was split into a northern and a southern division, the number of Landesligas expanded from three to five and the Bezirksoberligas abolished. All leagues from the Bezirksligas onwards were elevated one tier.

↑ Promoted	↓ Relegated

== DFB-Pokal appearances ==
The club has qualified for the first round of the German Cup three times:

Season	Round	Date	Home	Away	Result	Attendance
1979–80 DFB-Pokal	First round	26 August 1979	SG Wattenscheid 09	MTV Ingolstadt	2–1	
1980–81 DFB-Pokal	First round	30 August 1980	1. FSV Mainz 05	MTV Ingolstadt	3–2	
1987–88 DFB-Pokal	First round	28 August 1987	SV Werder Bremen II	MTV Ingolstadt	5–1	

== The Ingolstadt derby ==
The derby was played as high up as the 2nd Bundesliga but more common in the Oberliga and Landesliga. In 1979–80, the two clubs met for their only encounters in professional football:

Season	League	Teams	Home	Away
1979–80	2nd Bundesliga Süd (II)	MTV Ingolstadt – ESV Ingolstadt	2–1	2–2

Source:"MTV Ingolstadt » Die Bilanz gegen ESV Ingolstadt". Weltfussball.de.

== Departments ==
MTV currently features 16 sports and 2 cultural departments:

- Basketball
- Beach volleyball
- Fencing
- Football (Soccer)
- Physical fitness
- Handball
- Judo
- Karate and Kobudo
- Athletics
- Wrestling
- Chess
- Skiing
- Tennis
- Table tennis
- Gymnastics
- Volleyball
- Schäfflergilde (traditional dance)
- "Schanzer Volksbuehne" (amateur dramatic society)
