= TSG Augsburg =

German football and sports club

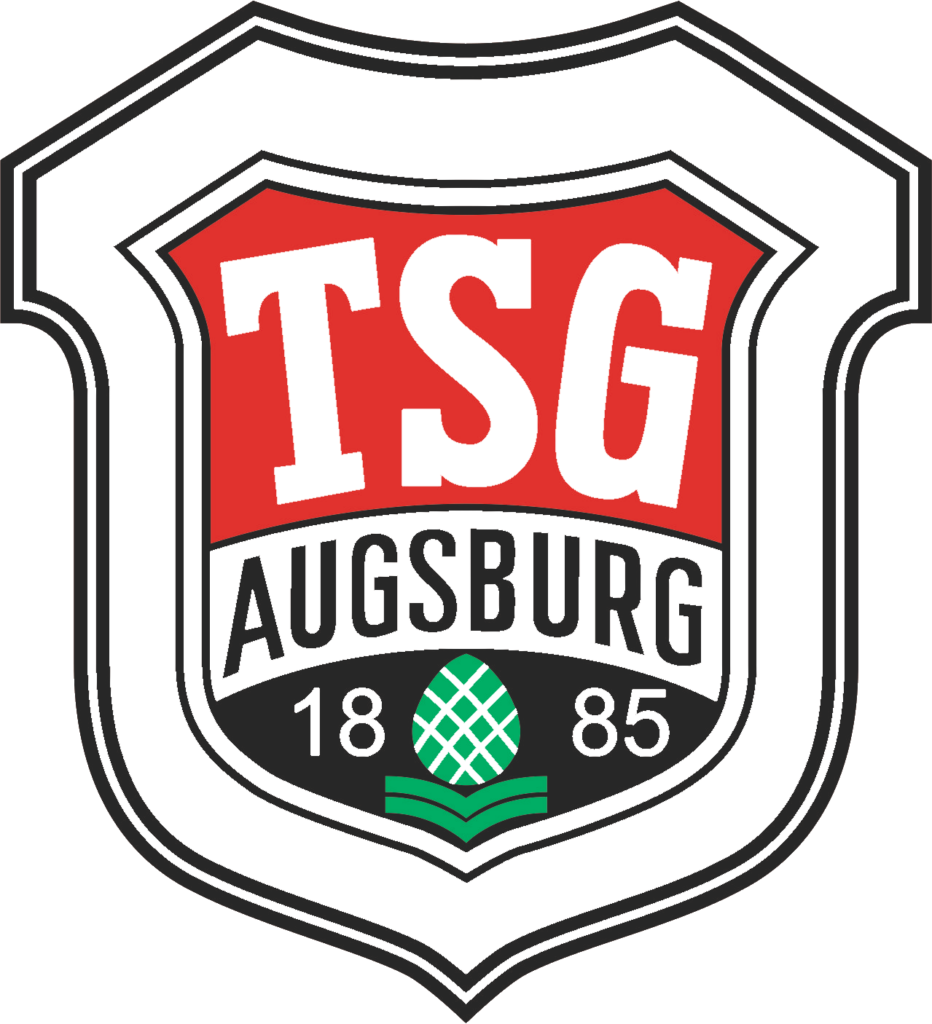
- Full name: Turn und Sportgemeinschaft 1885 Augsburg e. V.
- Founded: 1885
- Ground: TSG Sports Ground, Schillstraße
- Chairman: Herbert Hafner
- League: A-Klasse Augsburg-Ost (X)
- 2017–18: A-Klasse-Mitte, 10th

The TSG Augsburg is a German football and sports club from Augsburg, Swabia, formed in 1885. It consists of over 2,500 members in 13 different departments ranging from football to alpine skiing.

== Overview ==
The club was formed on 12 March 1885 at the Gasthaus Paradiesgarten, a restaurant and pub in the north of Augsburg, as TV Lechhausen. The club originally was focused on gymnastics. The club built a sports hall in the Augsburg suburb of Hammerschmiede in 1892. In 1918, the club formed a football team together with the players of the FC Lechhausen (formed 1911) which returned from the First World War. The football department within the club named itself FC Union and started to take part in the Bavarian leagues. In 1923, the club archived the championship in the A-Klasse and gained promotion to the second division. In 1924, the football department separated from the TV Lechhausen due to a change in the laws governing sports associations in Germany.

In August 1933, a group of local sports- and football-clubs merged to form the Turn- und Sportgemeinde Eintracht Augsburg, among them the TVL and the FC Union. This union however didn't last long and the varying clubs became independent again.

In 1934, the TVL and the FC Union merged again, this time for good, and formed the Turn- und Sport-Union 1885 Augsburg.

In April 1941, with the effects of World War II showing, the local clubs in the Lechhausen area had to finally merge and the TSG Augsburg was born.

In 1942, the new club managed to win promotion to the Gauliga Südbayern, the highest league in southern Bavaria at the time. In 1944, the ground of TSG was heavily damaged in one of many air-raids on the industrially important city of Augsburg.

After the war, the TSG spent two seasons in the Landesliga Bayern-South, then the second tier of football, from 1946 to 1948. In 1950, the club gained promotion again, this time to the Amateurliga Bayern (III) where it stayed till 1956 with a third place in 1955 being the highlight. The rest of its time were spent in the 2nd Amateurliga Schwaben.

In 1964, the club won promotion to the Amateurliga Bayern, winning the Landesliga Bayern-Süd. This success however only lasted for a year, the club finishing last in the Bayernliga and being relegated. In the coming years, TSG finished in the upper half of the Landesliga table, coming second in 1970 and 1975. In 1977, the club was relegated from the league to the Bezirksliga Schwaben-Nord.

In 1972, the club finished building a new sports hall at its old homeground at Schillstraße. The club continued to build new facilities, accumulating a large dept in the process which it found hard to pay off. In the process, the club nearly went broke. The only solution in the end was to sell the TSG sports ground and hall to the Augsburg city council and then lease it back.

TSG won the championship in the Bezirksliga in 1983 and returned to the Landesliga again. A third place in 1986 was a last highlight before the club went down again in 1988 to the new Bezirksoberliga Schwaben. After some initial success, further relegation could not be avoided. The club fell to an all-time low, to the point where they are now playing in the A-Klasse Augsburg 2, the lowest possible league level in Bavaria. It is a deep fall for a club that once was the number three in Augsburg football, behind FC Augsburg and TSV Schwaben. In the 2007–08 season, the TSG's fortunes improved and the club managed to dominate and win its division, gaining promotion.

After a second-place finish in the tier-ten Kreisklasse in 2009–10 the club gained promotion back to the Kreisliga for the first time since 2001. It lasted for two seasons at this level before being relegated again in 2012. A last-place finish in 2016 dropped TSG to the A-Klasse again.

== Notes ==
- The club should not be confused with the TSG Augsburg-Hochzoll, which is a separate club in the south of Augsburg, formed in 1889.
- In the registry of Bavarian football clubs it carries the number 3037.

== Honours ==
=== League ===
- Landesliga Bayern-Süd (IV)
  - Champions: 1964
  - Runners-up: 1970
- Bezirksliga Schwaben-Nord (V)
  - Champions: 1983
- A-Klasse Augsburg 2 (X)
  - Champions: 2008

=== Cup ===
- Schwaben Cup
  - Runners-up: 1970, 1987

== Recent seasons ==
The recent season-by-season performance of the club:

Year	Division	Tier	Position
1982–83	Bezirksliga Schwaben-Nord	V	1st ↑
1983–84	Landesliga Bayern-Süd	IV	7th
1984–85	Landesliga Bayern-Süd	IV	6th
1985–86	Landesliga Bayern-Süd	IV	3rd
1986–87	Landesliga Bayern-Süd	IV	7th
1987–88	Landesliga Bayern-Süd	IV	16th ↓
1988–89	Bezirksoberliga Schwaben	V	8th
1989–90	Bezirksoberliga Schwaben	V	7th
1990–91	Bezirksoberliga Schwaben	V	9th
1991–92	Bezirksoberliga Schwaben	V	8th
1992–93	Bezirksoberliga Schwaben	V	12th
1993–94	Bezirksoberliga Schwaben	V	13th
1994–95	Bezirksoberliga Schwaben	VI	16th ↓
1995–96	Bezirksliga Schwaben-Nord	VII	16th ↓
1996–97	Kreisliga Augsburg	VIII	11th
1997–98	Kreisliga Augsburg	VIII	2nd ↑
1998–99	Bezirksliga Schwaben-Nord	VII	11th
1999–2000	Bezirksliga Schwaben-Nord	VII	15th ↓

Year	Division	Tier	Position
2000–01	Kreisliga Augsburg	VIII	16th ↓
2001–02	Kreisklasse Augsburg-Mitte	IX	9th
2002–03	Kreisklasse Augsburg-Mitte	IX	2nd
2003–04	Kreisklasse Augsburg-Mitte	IX	7th
2004–05	Kreisklasse Augsburg-Mitte	IX	13th ↓
2005–06	A-Klasse Augsburg 1	X	4th
2006–07	A-Klasse Augsburg 2	X	2nd
2007–08	A-Klasse Augsburg 2	X	1st ↑
2008–09	Kreisklasse Augsburg 2	X	5th
2009–10	Kreisklasse Augsburg 2	X	2nd ↑
2010–11	Kreisliga Augsburg	IX	6th
2011–12	Kreisliga Augsburg	IX	13th ↓
2012–13	Kreisklasse Augsburg-Mitte	IX	12th
2013–14	Kreisklasse Augsburg-Mitte	IX	7th
2014–15	Kreisklasse Augsburg-Mitte	IX	10th
2015–16	Kreisklasse Augsburg-Mitte	IX	14th ↓
2016–17	A-Klasse Augsburg-Mitte	X	6th
2017–18	A-Klasse Augsburg-Mitte	X	10th

Source: "Das Fussball-Jahresjournal", an annual publication on football in Schwaben, author: Schwäbischer Fussball Verband (Schwaben FA)

In the early 2000s, the leagues in Bavaria below and including what is now the Kreisklasse changed their names:

- The A-Klasse became the Kreisliga
- The B-Klasse became the Kreisklasse
- The C-Klasse became the A-Klasse
- This was done to bring the system in line with the other German leagues. Only the new names were used in this list.
- With the introduction of the Bezirksoberligas in 1988 as the new fifth tier, below the Landesligas, all leagues below dropped one tier. With the introduction of the Regionalligas in 1994 and the 3. Liga in 2008 as the new third tier, below the 2. Bundesliga, all leagues below dropped one tier. With the establishment of the Regionalliga Bayern as the new fourth tier in Bavaria in 2012 the Bayernliga was split into a northern and a southern division, the number of Landesligas expanded from three to five and the Bezirksoberligas abolished. All leagues from the Bezirksligas onwards were elevated one tier.

↑ Promoted	↓ Relegated
