= 1938–39 Gauliga Bayern =

Gauliga Bayern
- Season: 1938–39
- Champions: 1. FC Schweinfurt 05
- Relegated: VfB Coburg; Schwaben Augsburg
- German championship: 1. FC Schweinfurt 05

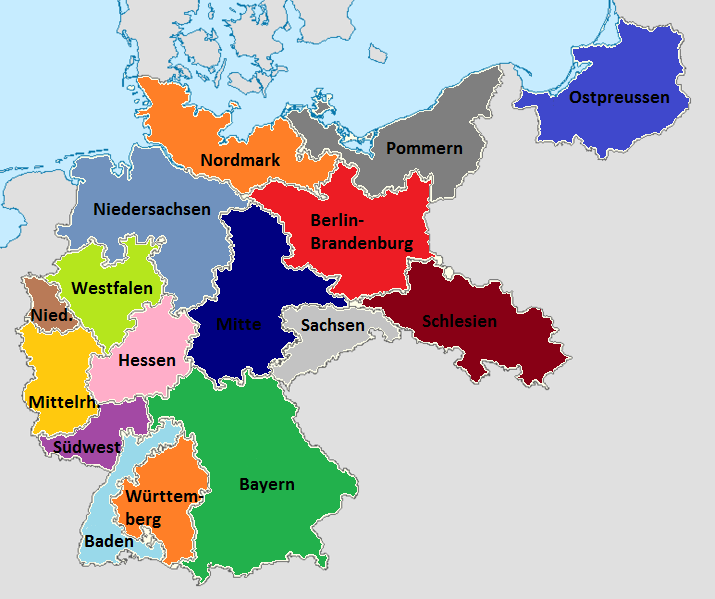
The initial 16 districts of the Gauliga with Bayern in green

The 1938–39 Gauliga Bayern was the sixth season of the league, one of the 18 Gauligas in Germany at the time. It was the first tier of the football league system in Bavaria (German: Bayern) from 1933 to 1945.

For 1. FC Schweinfurt 05 it was the first of two Gauliga championships the club would win in the era from 1933 to 1944. The club qualified for the 1939 German football championship, where it finished second in its group, on equal points with group winner Dresdner SC, and ahead of Warnsdorfer FK.

The fifth edition of the Tschammerpokal, now the DFB-Pokal, was won by Gauliga Bayern club 1. FC Nürnberg, defeating Waldhof Mannheim 2–0 in the final.

== Table ==
The 1938–39 season saw two new clubs in the league, BSG WKG Neumeyer Nürnberg and ASV Nürnberg.

| Pos | Team | Pld | W | D | L | GF | GA | GD | Pts | Promotion, qualification or relegation |
|---|---|---|---|---|---|---|---|---|---|---|
| 1 | 1. FC Schweinfurt 05 (C) | 18 | 10 | 3 | 5 | 37 | 27 | +10 | 23 | Qualification to German championship |
| 2 | TSV 1860 München | 18 | 8 | 6 | 4 | 33 | 21 | +12 | 22 | |
| 3 | SSV Jahn Regensburg | 18 | 8 | 4 | 6 | 43 | 24 | +19 | 20 | |
| 4 | BSG WKG Neumeyer Nürnberg | 18 | 9 | 2 | 7 | 27 | 23 | +4 | 20 | |
| 5 | 1. FC Nürnberg | 18 | 9 | 2 | 7 | 28 | 33 | −5 | 20 | |
| 6 | SpVgg Fürth | 18 | 8 | 3 | 7 | 23 | 26 | −3 | 19 | |
| 7 | FC Bayern Munich | 18 | 7 | 3 | 8 | 26 | 31 | −5 | 17 | |
| 8 | BC Augsburg | 18 | 4 | 6 | 8 | 28 | 35 | −7 | 14 | |
| 9 | VfB Coburg (R) | 18 | 6 | 2 | 10 | 27 | 39 | −12 | 14 | Relegation |
| 10 | Schwaben Augsburg (R) | 18 | 4 | 3 | 11 | 32 | 45 | −13 | 11 | Relegation |

Source: claudionicoletti.eu
Rules for classification: 1) Points
(C) Champions; (R) Relegated
