= Gauliga Bayern =

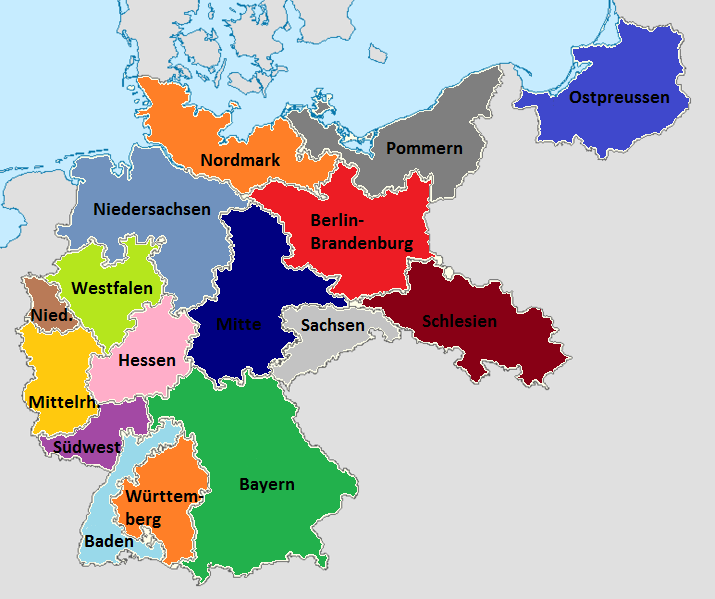
- Founded: 1933
- Folded: 1945
- Replaced by: Oberliga Süd
- Country: Nazi Germany
- State: Bavaria
- Gau (from 1934): Bayreuth; Franconia; Main-Franconia; Munich-Upper Bavaria; Swabia
- Level on pyramid: Level 1
- Domestic cup: Tschammerpokal
- Last champions: North: 1. FC Nürnberg South: FC Bayern Munich (1943–44)

The Gauliga Bayern was the highest association football league in the German state of Bavaria from 1933 to 1945. Shortly after the formation of the league, the Nazis reorganised the administrative regions in Germany, and the five Gaue Bayreuth, Munich-Upper Bavaria, Swabia, Main Franconia and Franconia de facto replaced the state of Bavaria which remained only as a symbolic region.

== Overview ==
The league was introduced by the Nazi Sports Office in 1933, after the Nazi takeover of power in Germany and Bavaria. It replaced the Bezirksliga Bayern as the highest level of play in German football competitions. Up until 1963, Germany did not have a nationwide highest league but rather operated on regional divisions with the winners of those entering a finals round for the German championship.

The Gauliga Bayern was established with twelve clubs from the state of Bavaria, but without any teams from the Palatinate region (German:Pfalz), then politically a part of Bavaria but not geographically connected to the rest of the state. The clubs from this region traditionally never played in the Bavarian leagues and were now added to the Gauliga Südwest/Mainhessen. The football clubs from Ulm, which had been playing in the Bavarian league system until 1933, now joined the Gauliga Württemberg.

The Gauliga replaced as such the two Bezirksligas of northern and southern Bavaria. The arrival of the Gauliga heralded somewhat the decline of Bavarian football. The 1. FC Nürnberg and SpVgg Fürth still dominated the Bavarian league but the national success both clubs had, especially in the 1920s, faded away. Until 1937, Nürnberg still made three more appearances in the German final and won in 1936, but no other Bavarian club had any success on the national championship level. Only in the German cup competition, the Tschammerpokal, did Nürnberg (1935, 1939) and 1860 Munich (1942) win some more titles.

In its first season, the league had twelve clubs, playing each other once at home and once away. The league winner qualified for the German championship while the bottom three teams were relegated. Over the next two seasons, the league was reduced at first to eleven, then ten teams. From 1935 to 1936, the Gauliga Bayern had two teams relegated per season, but the modus remained unchanged otherwise.

The 1939–40 season started on 27 August 1939, but with the outbreak of the Second World War four days later, league football was suspended. It only resumed at the end of October, with a number of local city-championships having been played to bridge the gap. In 1939–40, only one team was relegated as the league reverted to twelve teams for the following season.

After the 1941–42 season, the negative effects of the Second World War became seriously visible with player shortages and transport difficulties. The league was staged in a northern (11 teams) and a southern group (10 teams) in 1942–43 and 1943–44. No overall Bavarian championship was determined and both league winners went to the German finals competition.

The imminent collapse of Nazi Germany in 1945 gravely affected the Gauligas and in Bavaria the league was now staged in five regional groups. With the exception of the Munich division, most of the leagues had to shut down in late 1944.

Within the Bavarian capital, football games continued until almost the end of the war, with the last official game in Nazi Germany being the FC Bayern versus 1860 Munich derby on 23 April 1945, ending 3–2.

With the end of the Nazi era, the Gauligas ceased to exist and shortly after, in late 1945, in the US occupation zone in southern Germany, the Oberliga Süd came to be the highest league in this region.

== Founding members of the league ==
The twelve founding members and their positions in the 1932–33 season were:

- 1. FC Nürnberg, winner Bezirksliga Nordbayern
- TSV 1860 Munich, finished 2nd Bezirksliga Südbayern
- FC Bayern Munich, winner Bezirksliga Südbayern
- FC Schweinfurt 05, finished 3rd Bezirksliga Nordbayern
- TSV Schwaben Augsburg, finished 7th Bezirksliga Südbayern
- SpVgg Fürth, finished 2nd Bezirksliga Nordbayern
- ASV Nürnberg, finished 5th Bezirksliga Nordbayern
- Jahn Regensburg, finished 10th Bezirksliga Südbayern
- Wacker München, finished 4th Bezirksliga Südbayern
- FC Bayreuth, finished 4th Bezirksliga Nordbayern
- FV Würzburg 04, finished 7th Bezirksliga Nordbayern
- FC München, merger club of Teutonia (8th) and DSC München (6th)

== Winners and runners-up of the Gauliga Bayern ==
The winners and runners-up of the league:

Season	Winner	Runner-Up
1933–34	1. FC Nürnberg	TSV 1860 Munich
1934–35	SpVgg Fürth	1. FC Nürnberg
1935–36	1. FC Nürnberg	SpVgg Fürth
1936–37	1. FC Nürnberg	FC Schweinfurt 05
1937–38	1. FC Nürnberg	TSV 1860 Munich
1938–39	FC Schweinfurt 05	TSV 1860 Munich
1939–40	1. FC Nürnberg	BC Augsburg
1940–41	TSV 1860 Munich	1. FC Nürnberg
1941–42	FC Schweinfurt 05	SpVgg Fürth

Season	North	South
1942–43	1. FC Nürnberg	TSV 1860 Munich
1943–44	1. FC Nürnberg	FC Bayern Munich

== Placings in the Gauliga Bayern 1933–44 ==
In the 1942–43 and 1943–44 season, the league was split in two separate groups, North and South. The 1944–45 season was played in five separate groups but never completed.

=== Clubs from the northern division ===
Club	1934	1935	1936	1937	1938	1939	1940	1941	1942	1943	1944
1. FC Nürnberg	1	2	1	1	1	5	1	2	4	1	1
1. FC Bamberg										6	2
VfL Nürnberg^{3}										5	3
SpVgg Fürth	6	1	2	4	4	6	5	4	2	3	4
VfR 07 Schweinfurt							9	11		8	4
FC Schweinfurt 05 ^{1}	4	3	4	2	6	1	3	7	1	2	5
WTSV Schweinfurt											7
Post SG Fürth										10	8
Reichsbahn SG Weiden									12	4	9
Kickers Würzburg ^{2}								12		11	10
Viktoria Aschaffenburg										7	
Eintracht Franken Nürnberg									11	9	
BSG WKG Neumeyer Nürnberg^{3}						4	4	6	6		
FSV 1883 Nürnberg							10				
VfB Coburg				10		9					
ASV Nürnberg^{3}	7	7	5	9							
FC Bayreuth	10		9								
SpVgg Weiden		9									
FV Würzburg 04 ^{2}	11										

- In the final seasons, especially from 1943, many clubs formed war associations (KSG) with other teams due to the lack of players and resources:
  - ^{1} FC Schweinfurt 05 and LSV Schweinfurt merged their teams to form KSG Schweinfurt.
  - ^{2} Kickers Würzburg and FV Würzburg 04 merged their teams to form KSG Würzburg.
  - ^{3} ASV Nürnberg became BSG WKG Neumeyer Nürnberg in 1938 and VfL Nürnberg in 1942.

=== Clubs from the southern division ===
Club	1934	1935	1936	1937	1938	1939	1940	1941	1942	1943	1944
FC Bayern Munich	3	4	3	3	5	7	8	8	8	3	1
BC Augsburg ^{3}		8	6	5	7	8	2	3	7	2	2
TSV 1860 Munich	2	5	7	7	2	2	7	1	3	1	3
Luftwaffen SV Straubing										7	4
Jahn Regensburg	8	10			3	3	6	5	10	5	5
Wacker München	9	6	8	8	9			10	5	6	6
VfB Ingolstadt-Ringsee ^{4}				6	10						7
TSV Schwaben Augsburg	5	11			8	10		9	9	4	8
TSV Pfersee											9
TSG Augsburg										8	10
Bajuwaren München										9	
VfB München										10	
FC München	12		10								

Source: "Gauliga Bayern". Das deutsche Fussball-Archiv.

- In the final seasons, especially from 1943, many clubs formed war associations (KSG) with other teams due to the lack of players and resources:
  - ^{3} BC Augsburg merged teams with Post Augsburg to form KSG BC/Post Augsburg.
  - ^{4} VfB Ingolstadt-Ringsee merged teams with MTV Ingolstadt to form KSG Ingolstadt.
