= SpVgg SV Weiden =

German football club

- Full name: Spielvereinigung Sportverein Weiden e. V.
- Founded: 19 January 1924; 102 years ago
- Ground: Wasserwerk Stadion
- Capacity: 7,600
- Chairman: Michael Kurz
- Manager: Michael Riester
- League: Bayernliga Nord (V)
- 2025–26: Bayernliga Nord, 6th of 18
Home colours	Away colours

SpVgg SV Weiden, formerly just SpVgg Weiden, is a German football club from the city of Weiden, Bavaria.

Playing in the tier-four Regionalliga Süd in 2010–11, the club had to declare insolvency after being more than Euro 1 million in debt. Unable to raise enough funds to continue competing in the league, Weiden declared on 30 November 2010 that it would withdraw its Regionalliga team and thereby automatically be relegated. All games for the club in the 2010–11 season were declared void.

== History ==
Former logo of SpVgg Weiden

The side originated with the 1912 establishment of a football department in the gymnastics club Turnerbund Weiden. The footballers became independent on 19 January 1924 and enjoyed some early success in capturing local titles in 1924 and 1931, gaining promotion to the Bezirksliga Bayern for one season. Between 1929 and 1934 they were united with Fußball Club Windischeschenbach to play as SpVgg Weiden-Windischeschenbach. In 1934, the team qualified to play in the Gauliga Bayern, one of sixteen top flight divisions formed in the 1933 re-organization of German football under the Third Reich. They were relegated to lower level play after just one season, but returned to the Gauliga in 1941 in a union with Reichsbahn SV Weiden as part of the combined wartime side Reichsbahn Sport- und Spielvereinigung Weiden. This club remained in the top flight until the end of World War II.

Following the war the side resumed play as SpVgg Weiden and slipped to lower-tier football before making a comeback in the Landesliga Bayern (II) in 1947, making a fleeting single season appearance in second division play in 1954–55. In between, the club played in the Amateurliga Bayern (III), generally as a top side with good results.

The club failed to qualify for the new single-division Amateurliga Bayern and had to enter the new tier-four Landesliga Bayern-Mitte instead. It took out the league title there and advanced to the tier-two Regionalliga Süd in its first season back in the Amateurliga. Weiden only managed one season in the Regionalliga and was back in the Amateurliga in 1966. It remained a strong side there, taking out second places in 1971 and 1972 but, in 1975, it found itself relegated.

From 1977 to 1981, the club fell as far as the tier-five Bezirksliga but then returned to the Landesliga and, from there, back to what was now the Amateur Oberliga Bayern in 1985.

From the mid-80s on into the mid-90s the club played as a third division side and, following league re-structuring, carried on in what became the fourth tier Oberliga Bayern. Early in the 90s the team made first round appearances in German Cup play (1991 and 1992). After faltering briefly Weiden returned to Oberliga play on the strength of a Landesliga Bayern-Mitte (V) title in 2006. In the 2006–07 and 2007–08 seasons, the club finished eight in this league in both years. The 2008–09 season proved a very successful one for the club, winning the league and earning promotion to the Regionalliga Süd, a league it hasn't played in since 1966. It only lasted for two seasons at this level, declaring insolvency and thereby being automatically relegated and its record expunged. The club reformed as SpVgg Weiden 2010 and continued to field a team in the Landesliga in 2010–11, with the reserve team being elevated to first team status but suffering relegation. The club however fulfilled the qualifying norms of the Bavarian Football Association to continue on in the tier below, the Bezirksoberliga Oberpfalz rather than to reform in the lowest division.

At the end of the 2011–12 season the club qualified directly for the newly expanded Landesliga after finishing third in the Bezirksoberliga. The following season the club took out the championship in the Landesliga in convincing fashion with a 30-point gap to the second placed team and 33 wins in 38 games, thereby earning promotion back to the Bayernliga. Back in the Bayernliga the club finished fifth in 2013–14.

SpVgg Weiden has historically fielded a strong youth program. In 2010, its C-Junior (Under 15) team featured in the Las Vegas Mayor's Cup International Soccer Tournament, one of the top youth football tournaments in the United States.

== Stadium ==
SpVgg Weiden plays in the Stadion am Wasserwerk, opened in 1928 and renovated in 2009 (capacity 7,600, with 1,000 covered seats). A record 15,000 fans took in a 1967 match against SSV Jahn Regensburg (0–3).

== Honours ==
The club's honours:

=== League ===
- Upper Palatinate/Lower Bavaria championship
  - Champions: (3) 1934, 1940, 1941
- Bayernliga (V)
  - Champions: (3) 1954 (south), 1965, 2009
  - Runners-up: (2) 1971, 1972
- Landesliga Bayern-Mitte (V)
  - Champions: (5) 1954, 1964, 1985, 1988, 2006
  - Runners-up: 1995
- Landesliga Bayern-Nordost
  - Champions: 2013

=== Cup ===
- Bavarian Cup
  - Winner: 2009
  - Runners-up: 2015
- Oberpfalz Cup
  - Winner: (3) 1996, 1997, 2009

=== Youth ===
- Bavarian Under 19 championship
  - Runners-up: 1962

== Recent managers ==
Recent managers of the club:

Manager	Start	Finish
Horst Will	1 July 2006	30 June 2007
Norbert Schlegel	1 July 2007	29 November 2007
Gino Lettieri	11 December 2007	9 February 2010
Miloslav Janovsky	10 February 2010	30 June 2010
Günter Güttler	1 July 2010	31 December 2010
Andreas Schumacher	?	11 December 2011
Christian Stadler	14 December 2011	30 June 2015
Tomáš Galásek	1 July 2015	17 October 2016
Franz Koller	2 November 2016	30 June 2017
Stefan Fink	1 July 2017	30 March 2018
Florian Schrepel	1 April 2018	30 June 2018
Andreas Scheler	1 July 2018	29 June 2022
Rüdiger Fuhrmann	1 July 2022	Present

== Recent seasons ==
The recent season-by-season performance of the club:

=== SpVgg Weiden ===
Season	Division	Tier	Position
1999–2000	Bayernliga	IV	6th
2000–01	Bayernliga	IV	3rd
2001–02	Bayernliga	IV	12th
2002–03	Bayernliga	IV	10th
2003–04	Bayernliga	IV	13th
2004–05	Bayernliga	IV	17th ↓
2005–06	Landesliga Bayern-Mitte	V	1st ↑
2006–07	Bayernliga	IV	8th
2007–08	Bayernliga	IV	8th
2008–09	Bayernliga	V	1st ↑
2009–10	Regionalliga Süd	IV	10th
2010–11	Regionalliga Süd	IV	18th ↓
2011–12	Bezirksoberliga Oberpfalz	VII	3rd ↑
2012–13	Landesliga Bayern-Nordost	VI	1st ↑
2013–14	Bayernliga Nord	V	5th
2014–15	Bayernliga Nord	V	4th
2015–16	Bayernliga Nord	V	5th
2016–17	Bayernliga Nord	V	14th
2017–18	Bayernliga Nord	V	14th ↓
2018–19	Landesliga Bayern-Mitte	VI	3rd
2019–21	Landesliga Bayern-Mitte	VI	2nd
2021–22	Landesliga Bayern-Mitte	VI	1st ↑
2022–23	Bayernliga Nord	V	

=== SpVgg Weiden II ===
Season	Division	Tier	Position
1999–2000	Bezirksliga Oberpfalz-Nord	VI	3rd
2000–01	Bezirksliga Oberpfalz-Nord	VI	7th
2001–02	Bezirksliga Oberpfalz-Nord	VI	6th
2002–03	Bezirksliga Oberpfalz-Nord	VI	10th
2003–04	Bezirksliga Oberpfalz-Nord	VI	13th ↓
2004–05	Kreisliga Amberg-Weiden	VII	4th
2005–06	Kreisliga Amberg-Weiden	VII	8th
2006–07	Kreisliga Amberg-Weiden Nord	VII	1st ↑
2007–08	Bezirksliga Oberpfalz-Nord	VII	1st ↑
2008–09	Bezirksoberliga Oberpfalz	VII	2nd ↑
2009–10	Landesliga Bayern-Mitte	VI	12th
2010–11	Landesliga Bayern-Mitte	VI	18th ↓
2011–12	did not compete		
2012–13	Kreisklasse Amberg-Weiden West	IX	1st ↑
2013–14	Kreisliga Amberg-Weiden Nord	VIII	1st ↑
2014–15	Bezirksliga Oberpfalz-Nord	VII	14th ↓
2015–16	Kreisliga Amberg-Weiden Nord	VIII	5th
2016–17	Kreisliga Amberg-Weiden Nord	VIII	2nd
2017–18	Kreisliga Amberg-Weiden Nord	VIII	2nd
2018–19	Kreisliga Amberg-Weiden Nord	VIII	1st ↑
2019–21	Bezirksliga Oberpfalz-Nord	VII	8th
2021–22	Bezirksliga Oberpfalz-Nord	VII	7th
2022–23	Bezirksliga Oberpfalz-Nord	VII	

- With the introduction of the Bezirksoberligas in 1988 as the new fifth tier, below the Landesligas, all leagues below dropped one tier. With the introduction of the Regionalligas in 1994 and the 3. Liga in 2008 as the new third tier, below the 2. Bundesliga, all leagues below dropped one tier. With the establishment of the Regionalliga Bayern as the new fourth tier in Bavaria in 2012 the Bayernliga was split into a northern and a southern division, the number of Landesligas expanded from three to five and the Bezirksoberligas abolished. All leagues from the Bezirksligas onward were elevated one tier.

↑ Promoted	↓ Relegated

== DFB Cup appearances ==
The club has qualified for the first round of the German Cup three times, the most recent in 2009:

Season	Round	Date	Home	Away	Result	Attendance
DFB-Pokal 1990–91	First round	4 August 1990	SpVgg Weiden	SV Werder Bremen	1–2	
DFB-Pokal 1991–92	First round	1 August 1991	SpVgg Weiden	SV Darmstadt 98	1–2 aet	
DFB-Pokal 2009–10	First round	1 August 2009	SpVgg Weiden	Borussia Dortmund	1–3	9,765
