= BC Augsburg =

German football club

- Full name: Ballspiel-Club Augsburg
- Founded: 8 August 1907; 117 years ago
- Dissolved: 1969
- Ground: Rosenaustadion
- Capacity: 28,000
- League: defunct
Home colours	Away colours

BC Augsburg was a German football club based in Augsburg, Bavaria. The team was founded as Fußball-Club Allemannia Augsburg in 1907 and played as Ballspiel-Club Augsburg from 1921 to 1969. Facing imminent financial collapse, BC merged with the football side of TSV Schwaben Augsburg in July 1969 to form FC Augsburg. The union was short-lived and Schwaben re-established its own football department the following year. FCA remains active today and carries on the tradition of the original side.

== History ==
=== Foundation to WWII ===
On 11 May 1909, BC joined the gymnastics club Turnverein 1871 Oberhausen as that association's football department, based in the suburb of Oberhausen. Oberhausen merged with Turnverein Augsburg II to create Turn- und Sportverein 1871 Augsburg with the footballers playing as Ballspielclub im TSV 1847. A year later the footballers went their own way as a separate club and first adopted the name BC Augsburg.

In the 1930s the club shared unions with Sportverein Augsburg and Turn- und Sportverein Stadtbach. SV was established in 1888 as Turnverein Augsburg-Kriegshaber. A football department was formed within that club in 1916, became independent in 1924, and joined BC in 1935. TSV was formed in 1896 as Turnverein Stadtbach and its footballers went their own way as Fußball-Club Stadtbach in August 1919. In 1930 they were renamed VfL Teutonia Augsburg and on 15 June 1932 the association was joined by the athletics department of BC Augsburg. Two years later VfL rejoined its parent club to create TSV 1896 Stadtbach, which in its turn became part of BC in 1938.

=== WWII and postwar ===
German football was reorganized in 1933 under the Third Reich into 16 top-flight divisions known as Gauligen. BC finished second in regional second division that following year and beat FC Memmingen 3–2 in a promotion playoff to win its way into the Gauliga Bayern for the 1934–35 season. Over the next several seasons they played there as a lower to mid-table side with their best results coming as second places finishes in 1940 and 1943. During this period the team made two appearances (1935, 1943) in play for the Tschammer-Pokal, predecessor of today's DFB-Pokal (German Cup), and were put out in the early going on both occasions.

World War II caused player shortages and forced play to become more local in character. In 1943 the Gauliga Bayern became the Gauliga Südbayern and BC joined Post-SG Augsburg to form the wartime side Kriegspielgemeinde Augsburg. This club earned another second-place result in 1943–44 before conflict overtook the area and play ended nearly halfway into the 1944–45 season.

Following the war occupying Allied authorities order the dissolution of most organizations in the country, including sports and football clubs. BC was remade, but the former memberships of SV and TV left to form'TSV Kriegshaber in 1946.

BC Augsburg took up play in the first division Oberliga Süd in 1945, but were sent down after just two seasons. The bounced back with a Landesliga Bayern (II) title in 1948 and then beat 1. FC Bamberg (4–1, 1–1) in promotion round play. The Oberliga Süddeutschland became the Oberliga Süd in 1950, and BC spent 10 of the next 13 seasons in top flight play there, but struggled as a lower table side. After the 1963 formation of the Bundesliga, Germany's first national professional circuit, the Augsburg club became part of the second tier Regionalliga Süd. In 1965, BC captured the division title in the Amateurliga Bayern (III) and advanced to the semi-finals of the national amateur championship. Through the 60s the club bounced back and forth between second and third division play until financial problems led to 1969 merger with TSV Schwaben Augsburg that created current day club FC Augsburg.

== BC Augsburg Oberhausen ==
While the FC Augsburg holds up the traditions of the BCA, there is another club claiming some of the heritage of the club, the BC Augsburg-Oberhausen. Based in the Oberhausen suburb of Augsburg where once the BCA hailed from, the club plays its home games at the Sportanlage Nord. where the old BCA also was based.

The BCA-O was formed in 1970, a year after the old BCA disappeared, as Sportfreunde Oberhausen, but changed its name to BC Oberhausen in 1981 and, in 1990, to BC Augsburg-Oberhausen. Its logo is very similar to the old BCA logo, too. Coached by the BCA club legend Helmut Haller in the mid-1980s the club went as far as the Bezirksliga but was forced to withdraw from competitive football at the end of the 2012–13 season, with the aim of sitting out the following year and returning in 2014 in the lowest tier of league football. This step was forced on the club for financial reasons.

== Honours ==
The club's honours:

=== League ===
- Gauliga Bayern (I)
  - Runner-up: 1940
- 2nd Oberliga Süd (II)
  - Champions: 1961
  - Runners-up: 1952
- Bayernliga (III)
  - Champions: (2) 1948, 1966
  - Runners-up: (2) 1965, 1969
- 2. Amateurliga Schwaben (IV)
  - Champions: 1962^{‡}

=== Cup ===
- Bavarian Cup
  - Winners: 1951
- Schwaben Cup
  - Winners: 1965

=== Youth ===
- Bavarian Under 19 championship
  - Champions: (2) 1955, 1959
  - Runners-up: (2) 1956, 1957
- ^{‡} Reserve team.

== BC Augsburg seasons ==
The club's seasons from 1945 to 1969:

Season	Division	Tier	Position
1945–46	Oberliga Süd	I	8th
1946–47	Oberliga Süd	I	17th ↓
1947–48	Landesliga Bayern Süd	II	1st ↑
1948–49	Oberliga Süd	I	14th
1949–50	Oberliga Süd	I	10th
1950–51	Oberliga Süd	I	16th ↓
1951–52	2. Oberliga Süd	II	2nd ↑
1952–53	Oberliga Süd	I	11th
1953–54	Oberliga Süd	I	12th
1954–55	Oberliga Süd	I	7th
1955–56	Oberliga Süd	I	11th
1956–57	Oberliga Süd	I	13th

Season	Division	Tier	Position
1957–58	Oberliga Süd	I	12th
1958–59	Oberliga Süd	I	15th ↓
1959–60	2. Oberliga Süd	II	6th
1960–61	2. Oberliga Süd	II	1st ↑
1961–62	Oberliga Süd	I	11th
1962–63	Oberliga Süd	I	16th ↓
1963–64	Regionalliga Süd	II	19th ↓
1964–65	Amateurliga Bayern	III	2nd
1965–66	Amateurliga Bayern	III	1st ↑
1966–67	Regionalliga Süd	II	17th ↓
1967–68	Amateurliga Bayern	III	16th
1968–69	Amateurliga Bayern	III	2nd

↑ Promoted	↓ Relegated
