= 1945–46 Landesliga Bayern =

Landesliga Bayern
- Season: 1945–46
- Champions: 1. FC Bamberg
- Promoted: 1. FC Bamberg
- Relegated: none
- Matches played: 72

The 1945–46 season of the Landesliga Bayern, the second highest association football league of the German football league system in Bavaria at the time, was the inaugural season of the league. The first season of the league marked the restart of league football in Bavaria after the end of the Second World War.

== History ==
At the end of the Second World War most of Bavaria was occupied by the US Army and administrated by the Office of Military Government. Within the US occupation zone all football competitions, clubs and matches had to be approved by the Military Government. In late 1945 the Military Government permitted the formation of the Oberliga Süd as the new first division of football within the US occupation zone. Of the Bavarian clubs, 1. FC Nürnberg, TSV 1860 Munich, FC Bayern Munich, TSV Schwaben Augsburg, BC Augsburg, FC Schweinfurt 05 and SpVgg Fürth joined this league. The participation of the Bavarian clubs in the Oberliga rather than a regional Bavarian competition lead to initial conflict between those clubs and the organisation that would later become the Bavarian Football Association.

Below this, the new Landesliga Bayern was established as the second tier with nine clubs in the league, with the clubs selected through their performance in the Gauliga Bayern which became defunct in 1945. The league officially began operating in the spring of 1946 and, like all regional leagues in Bavaria in that season, were seen as a qualifying competition for a more organised season in 1946–47. 1. FC Bamberg became the first champion of this league which was operated under the very difficult post-war circumstances. Bamberg earned promotion to the Oberliga while no club was relegated from this league to the Landesliga Bayern. The league was expanded from a single division of nine clubs to two divisions of eleven clubs each. Therefore, no club was relegated from the Landesliga. From the 1948–48 season the league became known as the Bayernliga, the name it carries today.

== 1945–46 Standings ==
Of the nine clubs taking part in the inaugural season of the league 1. FC Bamberg had played in the Gauliga Oberfranken in the heavily disrupted and incomplete 1944–45 season, FC Eintracht Nürnberg had played in the Gauliga Mittelfranken, Jahn Regensburg in the Gauliga Oberpfalz/Niederbayern and Bajuwaren München and Wacker München in the Gauliga München/Oberbayern. Of the other clubs VfR Schweinfurt and Kickers Würzburg had played in the Gauliga Nordbayern in 1943–44, VfB Ingolstadt-Ringsee in the Gauliga Südbayern while ASV Nürnberg had not played in the Gauliga since 1937.

Pos	Team	Pld	W	D	L	GF	GA	GD	Pts	Promotion
1	1. FC Bamberg (C, P)	16	12	3	1	54	17	+37	27	Promotion to 1946–47 Oberliga Süd
2	SSV Jahn Regensburg	16	11	3	2	47	28	+19	25	
3	FC Wacker München	16	10	4	2	45	18	+27	24	
4	VfR Schweinfurt	16	4	6	6	30	33	−3	14	
5	SC Bajuwaren München	16	5	2	9	32	33	−1	12	
6	ASV Nürnberg	16	4	4	8	30	42	−12	12	
7	Kickers Würzburg	16	5	1	10	25	36	−11	11	
8	VfB Ingolstadt-Ringsee	16	4	2	10	18	40	−22	10	
9	FC Eintracht Nürnberg (Note: FC Eintracht Nürnberg started season as Eintracht/Franken Nürnberg, a Kriegsgemeinschaft or on-the-field war union, but this temporary merger was dissolved during the season.)	16	4	1	11	19	53	−34	9	

Source: Die Bayernliga 1945–1997
Rules for classification: 1) points; 2) goal difference; 3) number of goals scored.
(C) Champions; (P) Promoted
