= 2017–18 1. FC Schweinfurt 05 season =

1. FC Schweinfurt 05
2017–18 season
- President: Markus Wolf
- Head coach: Gerd Klaus
- Stadium: Willy-Sachs-Stadion
- Regionalliga Bayern: 3rd
- DFB-Pokal: Second round
- Bavarian Cup: Winners
- Top goalscorer: League: Adam Jabiri (28); All: Adam Jabiri (30)
- Highest home attendance: 15,060
- Lowest home attendance: 402
- Average home league attendance: 1,335
- Biggest win: Aubstadt 0–5 Schweinfurt; Schweinfurt 7–2 Unterföhring
- Biggest defeat: Schweinfurt 0–4 Frankfurt
Home colours	Away colours	Third colours
- All statistics correct as of 24 August 2021.

The 2017–18 1. FC Schweinfurt 05 season was the 113th season in the history of the association football club based in Schweinfurt, Germany. In addition to the domestic league, Schweinfurt also participated in the 2017–18 DFB-Pokal, and in the season's edition of the Bavarian Cup. This was the 82nd season for Schweinfurt in the Willy-Sachs-Stadion. The season covered a period from 1 July 2017 to 30 June 2018.

== Players ==
=== Squad ===
As of 10 August 2017

Note: Flags indicate national team as defined under FIFA eligibility rules; some limited exceptions apply. Players may hold more than one non-FIFA nationality.

No.	Pos.	Nation	Player
1	GK	(Germany) GER	Alexander Eiban
2	DF	(Germany) GER	Herbert Paul
3	DF	(Germany) GER	Andreas Bauer
4	DF	(Germany) GER	Kevin Bär
5	DF	(Germany) GER	Marco Janz (captain)
6	MF	(Germany) GER	Christopher Kracun
7	MF	(Germany) GER	Marco Fritscher
8	MF	(Germany) GER	Michael Schlicht
9	FW	(Germany) GER	Nicolas Görtler
10	MF	(Germany) GER	Lukas Kling (vice-captain)
11	MF	(Germany) GER	Christopher Lehmann
12	GK	(Germany) GER	David Paulus
14	MF	(Germany) GER	Max Hillenbrand

No.	Pos.	Nation	Player
15	MF	(Germany) GER	Kevin Fery
16	MF	(Germany) GER	Vincent Waigand
17	DF	(Germany) GER	Matthias Strohmaier
19	MF	(Germany) GER	Steffen Krautschneider
20	MF	(Germany) GER	Nikola Jelišić
21	DF	(Germany) GER	Dominik Weiß
22	FW	(Germany) GER	Florian Pieper
23	DF	(Germany) GER	Philip Messingschlager
24	DF	(Germany) GER	Patrick Wolf
27	FW	(Germany) GER	Adam Jabiri
30	MF	(Germany) GER	Marius Willsch
32	DF	(Germany) GER	Lukas Billick

== Competitions ==
=== Regionalliga Bayern ===
==== Results by round ====
Round	1	2	3	4	5	6	7	8	9	10	11	12	13	14	15	16	17	18	19	20	21	22	23	24	25	26	27	28	29	30	31	32	33	34	35	36	37	38
Ground	A	H	A	H	A	-	A	H	A	H	A	H	A	H	A	H	H	H	A	H	A	H	A	H	-	H	A	H	A	H	A	H	A	H	A	A	A	H
Result	W	W	W	W	L	-	L	W	D	W	D	W	L	D	D	L	W	W	D	W	L	L	W	D	-	W	W	W	L	D	W	L	W	W	W	W	D	W
Position	3	1	1	2	2	3	5	3	3	2	2	2	2	2	3	5	4	4	4	3	4	4	5	5	5	5	5	4	5	5	5	5	4	3	3	3	3	3

Updated to match(es) played on Mai 2018. Source: BFV
A = Away; H = Home; W = Win; D = Draw; L = Loss

==== Matches ====
League fixtures as announced by BFV:

Win Draw Loss Fixtures

15 July 2017 1	1. FC Nürnberg II	2–4	1. FC Schweinfurt 05	Nürnberg
14:00 CEST (UTC+02:00)		Report		Stadium: Sportpark Valznerweiher; Attendance: 451; Referee: Roman Potemkin

21 July 2017 2	1. FC Schweinfurt 05	4–1	VfB Eichstätt	Schweinfurt
19:00 CEST (UTC+02:00)		Report		Stadium: Willy-Sachs-Stadion; Attendance: 2000; Referee: Markus Pflaum

25 July 2017 3	FC Pipinsried	0–2	1. FC Schweinfurt 05	Altomünster
19:00 CEST (UTC+02:00)		Report		Stadium: Hauptplatz FC Pipinsried; Attendance: 810; Referee: Michael Bacher

29 July 2017 4	1. FC Schweinfurt 05	2–1	FC Augsburg II	Schweinfurt
14:00 CEST (UTC+02:00)				Stadium: Willy-Sachs-Stadion; Attendance: 1669; Referee: Eduard Beitinger

4 August 2017 5	FC Bayern München II	2–1	1. FC Schweinfurt 05	München
19:00 CEST (UTC+02:00)		Report		Stadium: Städtisches Stadion an der Grünwalder Straße; Attendance: 915; Referee: Marco Achmüller

19 August 2017 7	SpVgg Bayreuth	3–1	1. FC Schweinfurt 05	Bayreuth
14:00 CEST (UTC+02:00)		Report		Stadium: Hans-Walter-Wild-Stadion; Attendance: 1726; Referee: Lothar Ostheimer

25 August 2017 8	1. FC Schweinfurt 05	3–1	FC Memmingen	Schweinfurt
19:00 CEST (UTC+02:00)		Report		Stadium: Willy-Sachs-Stadion; Attendance: 1416; Referee: Thomas Berg

1 September 2017 9	Wacker Burghausen	0–0	1. FC Schweinfurt 05	Burghausen
19:00 CEST (UTC+02:00)		Report		Stadium: Wacker-Arena; Attendance: 920; Referee: Tobias Schultes

8 September 2017 10	1. FC Schweinfurt 05	1–0	TSV Buchbach	Schweinfurt
19:00 CEST (UTC+02:00)		Report		Stadium: Willy-Sachs-Stadion; Attendance: 1750; Referee: Christopher Schwarzmann

15 September 2017 11	TSV 1860 Rosenheim	2–2	1. FC Schweinfurt 05	Rosenheim
19:00 CEST (UTC+02:00)		Report		Stadium: Jahnstadion; Attendance: 380; Referee: Luka Beretic

22 September 2017 12	1. FC Schweinfurt 05	3–1	SV Schalding-Heining	Schweinfurt
19:00 CEST (UTC+02:00)		Report		Stadium: Willy-Sachs-Stadion; Attendance: 1152; Referee: Jonas Schieder

30 September 2017 13	TSV 1860 München	3–1	1. FC Schweinfurt 05	München
14:05 CEST (UTC+02:00)		Report		Stadium: Städtisches Stadion an der Grünwalder Straße; Attendance: 12,200; Referee: Steffen Grimmeißen

19 September 2017 14	1. FC Schweinfurt 05	1–1	FV Illertissen	Schweinfurt
19:00 CEST (UTC+02:00)		Report		Stadium: Willy-Sachs-Stadion; Attendance: 907; Referee: Roman Potemkin

7 October 2017 15	SV Seligenporten	1–1	1. FC Schweinfurt 05	Pyrbaum
14:00 CEST (UTC+02:00)		Report		Stadium: M.A.R.-Arena; Attendance: 342; Referee: Andreas Hummel

14 October 2017 16	1. FC Schweinfurt 05	0–3	FC Ingolstadt II	Schweinfurt
14:00 CEST (UTC+02:00)		Report		Stadium: Willy-Sachs-Stadion; Attendance: 994; Referee: Stefan Treiber

20 October 2017 17	1. FC Schweinfurt 05	3–0	VfR Garching	Schweinfurt
19:00 CEST (UTC+02:00)		Report		Stadium: Willy-Sachs-Stadion; Attendance: 794; Referee: Lothar Ostheimer

28 October 2017 18	1. FC Schweinfurt 05	2–0	SpVgg Greuther Fürth II	Schweinfurt
14:00 CEST (UTC+02:00)		Report		Stadium: Willy-Sachs-Stadion; Attendance: 778; Referee: Luka Beretic

31 October 2017 19	FC Unterföhring	1–1	1. FC Schweinfurt 05	Kirchheim bei München
14:00 CEST (UTC+02:00)		Report		Stadium: Sportpark Heimstetten; Attendance: 235; Referee: Jochen Gschwendtner

6 November 2017 20	1. FC Schweinfurt 05	3–0	1. FC Nürnberg II	Schweinfurt
20:15 CET (UTC+01:00)		Report		Stadium: Willy-Sachs-Stadion; Attendance: 501; Referee: Florian Riepl

11 November 2018 21	VfB Eichstätt	3–0	1. FC Schweinfurt 05	Eichstätt
14:00 CET (UTC+01:00)		Report		Stadium: Liqui-Moly-Stadion; Attendance: 780; Referee: Benedikt Öllinger

18 November 2017 22	1. FC Schweinfurt 05	1–2	FC Pipinsried	Schweinfurt
14:00 CET (UTC+01:00)		Report		Stadium: Willy-Sachs-Stadion; Attendance: 671; Referee: Angelika Söder

25 November 2017 23	FC Augsburg II	1–3	1. FC Schweinfurt 05	Augsburg
13:00 CET (UTC+01:00)		Report		Stadium: Rosenaustadion; Attendance: 153; Referee: Johannes Huber

6 March 2018 24	1. FC Schweinfurt 05	1–1	FC Bayern München II	Schweinfurt
18:00 CET (UTC+01:00)		Report		Stadium: Willy-Sachs-Stadion; Attendance: 1540; Referee: Steffen Grimmeißen

25 April 2018 26	1. FC Schweinfurt 05	7–3	SpVgg Bayreuth	Schweinfurt
18:30 CEST (UTC+02:00)		Report		Stadium: Willy-Sachs-Stadion; Attendance: 402; Referee: Benjamin Cortus

10 March 2018 27	FC Memmingen	3–4	1. FC Schweinfurt 05	Memmingen
14:00 CET (UTC+01:00)		Report		Stadium: Arena Memmingen; Attendance: 573; Referee: Patrick Hanslbauer

17 March 2018 28	1. FC Schweinfurt 05	2–1	Wacker Burghausen	Schweinfurt
14:00 CET (UTC+01:00)		Report		Stadium: Willy-Sachs-Stadion; Attendance: 769; Referee: Markus Pflaum

23 March 2018 29	TSV Buchbach	1–0	1. FC Schweinfurt 05	Buchbach
19:00 CET (UTC+01:00)		Report		Stadium: SMR-Arena; Attendance: 625; Referee: Andreas Hummel

29 March 2018 30	1. FC Schweinfurt 05	0–0	TSV 1860 Rosenheim	Schweinfurt
19:00 CET (UTC+01:00)		Report		Stadium: Willy-Sachs-Stadion; Attendance: 831; Referee: Roman Potemkin

2 April 2018 31	SV Schalding-Heining	1–2	1. FC Schweinfurt 05	Passau
14:00 CEST (UTC+02:00)		Report		Stadium: Stadion Schalding-Heining; Attendance: 1,429; Referee: Benedikt Öllinger

7 April 2018 32	1. FC Schweinfurt 05	1–3	TSV 1860 München	Schweinfurt
14:05 CEST (UTC+02:00)		Report		Stadium: Willy-Sachs-Stadion; Attendance: 6,872; Referee: Tobias Schultes

13 April 2018 33	FV Illertissen	2–3	1. FC Schweinfurt 05	Illertissen
19:00 CEST (UTC+02:00)		Report		Stadium: Vöhlinstadion; Attendance: 440; Referee: Angelika Söder

17 April 2018 34	1. FC Schweinfurt 05	4–1	SV Seligenporten	Schweinfurt
19:00 CEST (UTC+02:00)		Report		Stadium: Willy-Sachs-Stadion; Attendance: 609; Referee: Florian Fleischmann

21 April 2018 35	FC Ingolstadt II	2–3	1. FC Schweinfurt 05	Ingolstadt
14:00 CEST (UTC+02:00)		Report		Stadium: BSA Ingolstadt Süd-Ost; Attendance: 150; Referee: Michael Bacher

28 April 2018 36	VfR Garching	2–4	1. FC Schweinfurt 05	Garching
14:00 CEST (UTC+02:00)		Report		Stadium: Garmin-Stadion am See; Attendance: 250; Referee: Florian Badstübner

7 May 2018 37	SpVgg Greuther Fürth II	2–2	1. FC Schweinfurt 05	Fürth
18:00 CEST (UTC+02:00)		Report		Stadium: Sportpark Ronhof; Attendance: 185; Referee: Dr. Markus Huber

12 May 2018 38	1. FC Schweinfurt 05	7–2	FC Unterföhring	Schweinfurt
14:05 CEST (UTC+02:00)		Report		Stadium: Willy-Sachs-Stadion; Attendance: 738; Referee: Steffen Grimmeißen

=== DFB-Pokal ===
DFB-Pokal fixtures as announced by DFB:

Win Draw Loss Fixtures

8 August 2017 First round	1. FC Schweinfurt 05	2–1	SV Sandhausen	Schweinfurt
15:30 CEST (UTC+2)	Willsch 53' Krautschneider 62'	Report	Höler 11'	Stadium: Willy-Sachs-Stadion; Attendance: 4,610; Referee: Dr. Robert Kampka

24 October 2017 Second round	1. FC Schweinfurt 05	0–4	Eintracht Frankfurt	Schweinfurt
20:45 CEST (UTC+2)		Report	Haller 14', 58' Wolf 63' Blum 85'	Stadium: Willy-Sachs-Stadion; Attendance: 15,060; Referee: Dr. Arne Aarnink

=== Bavarian Cup ===
Bavarian Cup fixtures as announced by BFV:

Win Draw Loss Fixtures

8 August 2017 First round	TSV 06 Gochsheim	0–3	1. FC Schweinfurt 05	Gochsheim
18:30 CEST (UTC+2)		Report		Stadium: Sportgelände Gochsheim

22 August 2017 Second round	TSV Aubstadt	0–5	1. FC Schweinfurt 05	Aubstadt
18:00 CEST (UTC+2)		Report		Stadium: Schulstadion Aubstadt

5 September 2017 Round of 16	Viktoria Aschaffenburg	2–2 aet / 5–7 pen	1. FC Schweinfurt 05	Aschaffenburg
17:30 CEST (UTC+2)		Report		Stadium: Stadion am Schönbusch; Attendance: 577; Referee: Thomas Stein

3 October 2017 Quarter–finals	1. FC Schweinfurt 05	2–1	SpVgg Unterhaching	Schweinfurt
18:30 CEST (UTC+2)		Report		Stadium: Willy-Sachs-Stadion

10 April 2018 Semi–finals	1. FC Schweinfurt 05	4–1	FC Memmingen	Schweinfurt
19:00 CEST (UTC+2)		Report		Stadium: Willy-Sachs-Stadion

21 May 2018 Final	SpVgg Bayreuth	1–3	1. FC Schweinfurt 05	Bayreuth
14:30 CEST (UTC+2)	Knezevic 19'	Report	Fery 9' Pieper 41' Jabiri 73'	Stadium: Hans-Walter-Wild-Stadion; Attendance: 3,762; Referee: Wolfgang Haslberger
