= Stadion am Hutrasen =

Football stadium in Schweinfurt, Germany

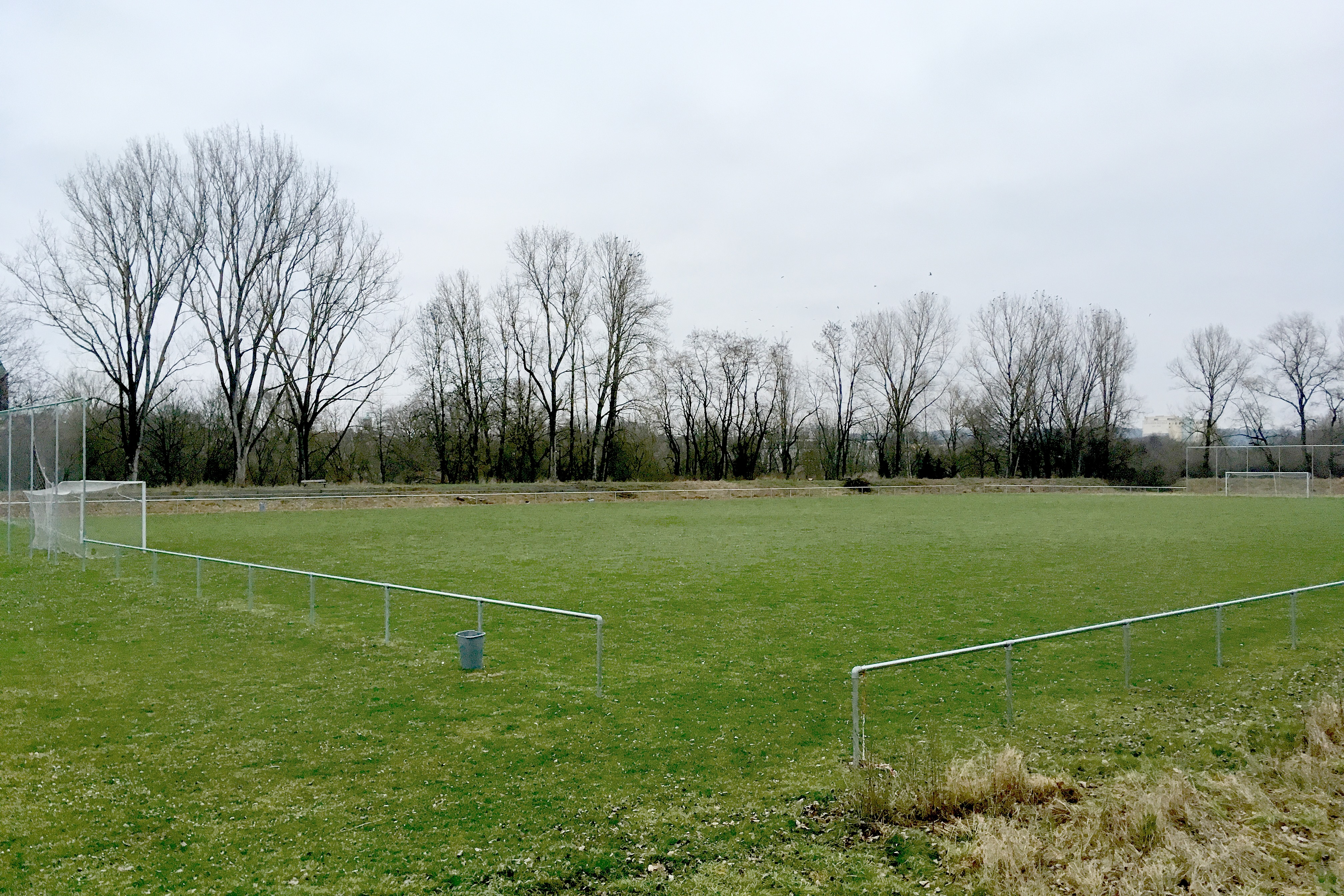
- Interactive map of Stadion am Hutrasen
- Full name: Stadion am Hutrasen
- Location: Schweinfurt, Germany
- Coordinates: 50°2′19.1″N 10°14′3.7″E
- Owner: Türkiyemspor SV-12 Schweinfurt
- Capacity: 3,000 (1941: 6,000)
- Surface: Grass

Construction
- Built: 1905 (as sports ground); 1928 (as stadium)

Tenants
- 1. FC Schweinfurt 05 (1905–1919); VfR 07 Schweinfurt (1928–2011); Hilalspor Schweinfurt (2011–2012); Türkiyemspor SV-12 Schweinfurt (2012–present)

Stadion am Hutrasen was a football stadium and is now a sports ground in Schweinfurt, Germany. It was the venue of 1. FC Schweinfurt 05 and VfR 07 Schweinfurt, and is today used by Türkiyemspor SV-12 Schweinfurt for its home games.

== History ==
In 1905, the City of Schweinfurt donated a lawn at Hutrasen, south of river Main, to newly established 1. FC Schweinfurt 05 as training ground and for its home games. At the end of the First World War, however, the club had to move to a court in close proximity.

After interim use as agricultural area, in 1928 Hutrasen became the home to local competitor VfR 07 Schweinfurt, who expanded the ground into a football stadium with a capacity of 6,000 in 1941. At that time, the club of Germany international footballer Robert Bernard had a couple of successful seasons in the top tier Gauliga Bayern. In 1940, VfR Schweinfurt defeated Mühlheimer SV 06 2–1 at Stadion am Hutrasen in its first round match to the German Cup (Tschammerpokal).

After World War II, VfR 07 could not continue on the old road to success, and Stadion am Hutrasen hosted lower league football only. In the 1960s, the sports ground became unusable for a few years due to the Rhine–Main–Danube Canal construction project. As a consequence, the pitch had to be turned by 90 degrees, and today is not exactly located at its former position.

VfR 07 Schweinfurt had to declare insolvency in April 2011, and Stadion am Hutrasen was leased to Turkish-German club Hilalspor Schweinfurt, which is now Türkiyemspor SV-12 Schweinfurt. VfR Schweinfurt was finally dissolved in 2015.
