= Alexander Eiban =

German footballer

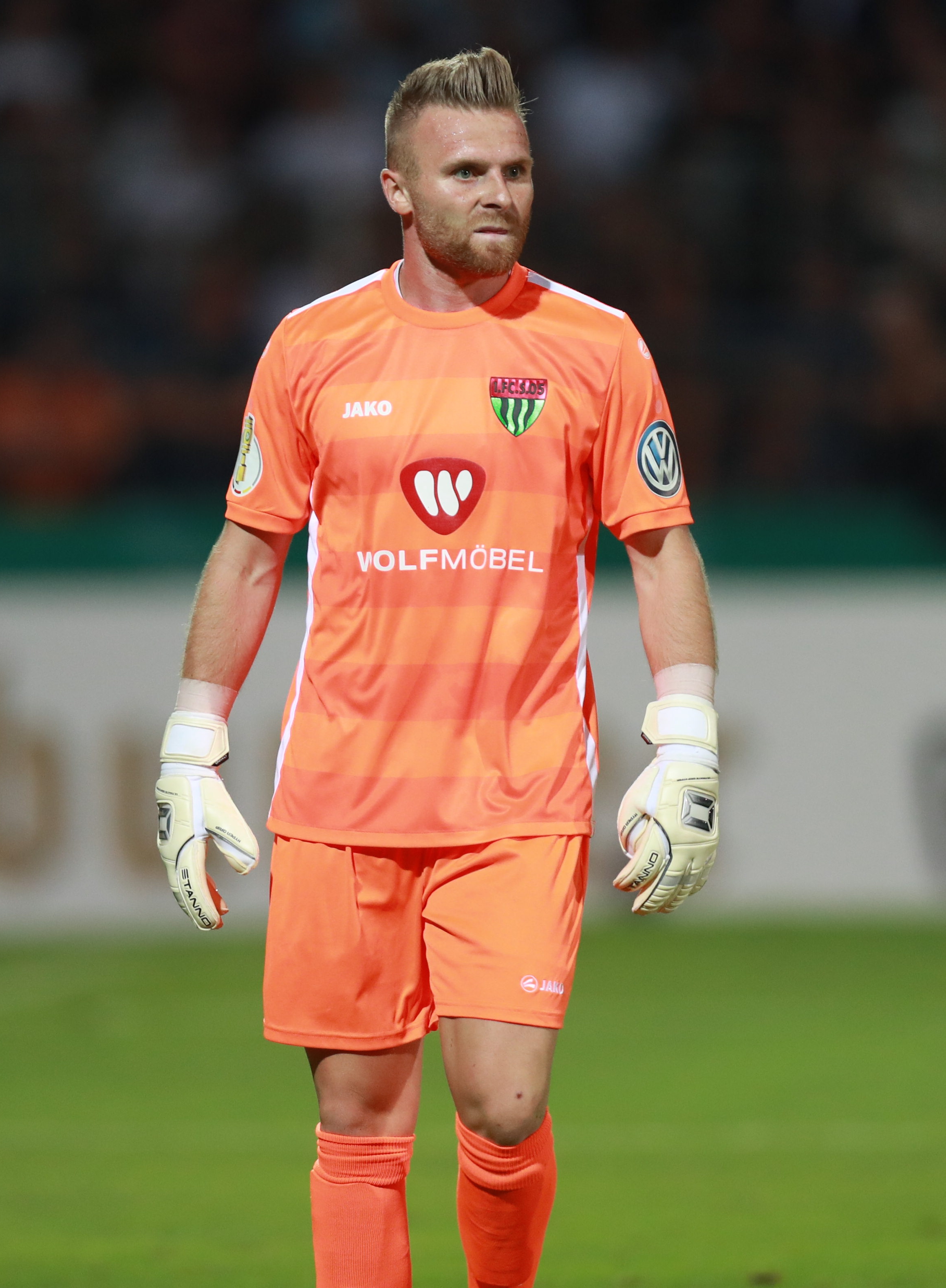
- Eiban in 2018

Personal information
- Date of birth: 5 May 1994 (age 32)
- Place of birth: Gräfelfing, Germany
- Height: 1.83 m (6 ft 0 in)
- Position: Goalkeeper

Youth career
- ESV Laim
- 1860 Munich
- SpVgg Unterhaching
- –2012: Bayern Munich

Senior career*
Years	Team	Apps	(Gls)
2012–2017	Wacker Burghausen II	13	(0)
2012–2017	Wacker Burghausen	86	(0)
2017–2019	Schweinfurt 05	66	(0)
2019–2020	Sportfreunde Lotte	10	(0)
2021–2022	FC Pipinsried	31	(0)
- * Club domestic league appearances and goals as of 21 May 2022

Alexander Eiban (born 5 May 1994) is a German footballer who plays as a goalkeeper.

== Honours ==
1. FC Schweinfurt 05

- Bavarian Cup: 2017–18
