= 1939–40 Gauliga Bayern =

Gauliga Bayern
- Season: 1939–40
- Champions: 1. FC Nürnberg
- Relegated: none
- German championship: 1. FC Nürnberg

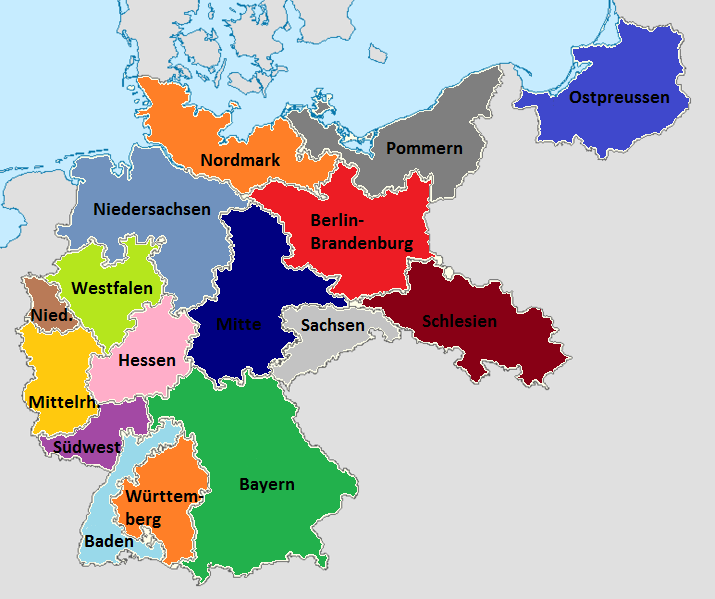
The initial 16 districts of the Gauliga with Bayern in green

The 1939–40 Gauliga Bayern was the seventh season of the league, one of the 18 Gauligas in Germany at the time. It was the first tier of the football league system in Bavaria (German:Bayern) from 1933 to 1945.

For 1. FC Nürnberg it was the fifth of seven Gauliga championships the club would win in the era from 1933 to 1944. The club qualified for the 1940 German football championship, where it was knocked out after finishing second in its group, behind group winner SV Waldhof Mannheim, and ahead of Stuttgarter Kickers and Kickers Offenbach.

The sixth edition of the Tschammerpokal, now the DFB-Pokal, saw holders 1. FC Nürnberg defeated 2–1 after extra time in the final by Dresdner SC.

== Table ==
The 1939–40 season saw two new clubs in the league, VfR 07 Schweinfurt and FSV Nürnberg.

Pos	Team	Pld	W	D	L	GF	GA	GD	Pts	Promotion, qualification or relegation
1	1. FC Nürnberg (C)	18	13	3	2	56	13	+43	29	Qualification to German championship
2	BC Augsburg	18	12	4	2	49	16	+33	28	
3	1. FC Schweinfurt 05	18	12	1	5	49	17	+32	25	
4	BSG WKG Neumeyer Nürnberg	18	12	1	5	46	31	+15	25	
5	SpVgg Fürth	18	8	3	7	35	25	+10	19	
6	SSV Jahn Regensburg	18	7	3	8	40	44	−4	17	
7	TSV 1860 München	18	7	2	9	34	36	−2	16	
8	FC Bayern Munich	18	3	4	11	21	32	−11	10	
9	VfR 07 Schweinfurt	18	3	3	12	23	59	−36	9	
10	FSV Nürnberg	18	0	2	16	13	93	−80	2	

Source: claudionicoletti.eu
Rules for classification: 1) Points
(C) Champions
