= VfR 07 Schweinfurt =

Coordinates: 50°2′19.1″N 10°14′3.7″E

- Full name: Verein für Rasenspiele 1907 Schweinfurt e.V.
- Nickname: Die Rot-Schwarzen
- Founded: 14 May 1907
- Dissolved: 2015
- Ground: Stadion am Hutrasen
- Capacity: 6,000 (1941)
Home colours	Away colours

Verein für Rasenspiele 1907 Schweinfurt e.V., called VfR 07 Schweinfurt, VfR Schweinfurt, or simply VfR 07, was a German association football club established in Schweinfurt (Bavaria) in 1907. The club dissolved in 2015 after it had gone bankrupt.

VfR Schweinfurt experienced a number of successful years from the late 1930s to the early 1940s. The club appeared in the top-tier Gauliga Bayern for four seasons overall, and made it into the second round of the German Cup in 1940. After the Second World War, VfR 07 was not able to play any role on the national level.

The club's home games were held at Stadion am Hutrasen in Schweinfurt from 1928 on.

== History ==
=== Early years ===
The football club was founded in May 1907 as 1. FV Viktoria 1907 Schweinfurt. After a fusion with FC Union 1909 Schweinfurt in May 1926, it obtained its name, lasting until 2015. In 1928 the team moved to Hutrasen, which was expanded to become a football stadium with a capacity of 6,000 (1941).

=== Successful years ===
The club gained first class status with promotion to the top-tier Gauliga Bayern in 1939. The team finished 9th in the 1939–40 season, achieving its best position during the single division Gauliga era. Again in 1940, VfR Schweinfurt reached the second round of the German Cup (Tschammerpokal), where it lost to 1938 cup winner and later German football champion SK Rapid Wien. After it was relegated in 1941, the club returned to Gauliga Bayern - now split into a northern and a southern division due to the Second World War - for a further two years in 1942.

VfR 07 midfielder Robert Bernard became a Germany international footballer in 1936 when he earned two caps during the Olympic Summer Games in Berlin. In addition, the club provided the education for 1938 FIFA World Cup and Europe XI selection player Andreas "Ander" Kupfer, who joined the local rival 1. FC Schweinfurt 05 in 1933.

=== Late years ===
After World War II, VfR 07 was reclassified into tier-two Landesliga Bayern, and many of the players, among them Robert Bernard, now joined Schweinfurt 05 as well. The club could not continue on the old road to success, and for decades played in lower football leagues only. A noteworthy highlight back then was a short period in tier-four Landesliga Bayern-Nord from the late 1970s on.

Due to growing financial problems combined with membership decline, the club had to declare insolvency in April 2011. Stadion am Hutrasen was leased to Hilalspor Schweinfurt, and VfR 07 Schweinfurt was finally dissolved in 2015.

== Honours ==
=== Cup ===
- German Cup
  - Second round: 1940

== Seasons ==
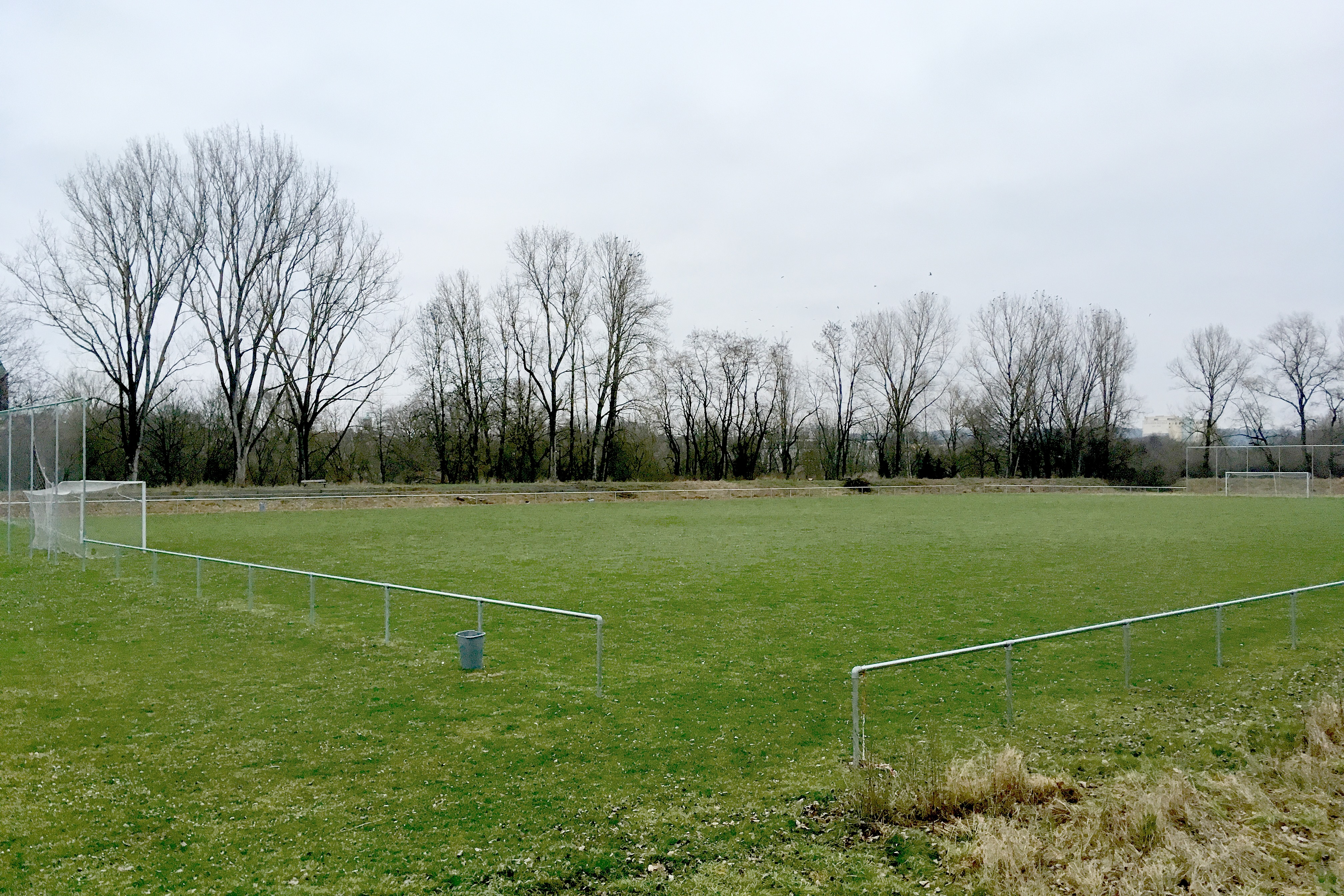
Hutrasen (2018)

Performance of the club during its most successful years 1938–1947 and 1978–1981:

Season	Division	Tier	Position
1938–39	Bezirksliga	II	↑
1939–40	Gauliga Bayern	I	9th
1940–41	Gauliga Bayern	I	11th ↓
1941–42	Bezirksliga	II	↑
1942–43	Gauliga Nordbayern	I	8th
1943–44	Gauliga Nordbayern	I	4th
1944–45	Gauliga Bayern	I	no results
1945–46	Landesliga Bayern	II	4th
1946–47	Landesliga Bayern Nord	II	11th ↓
1978–79	Landesliga Bayern-Nord	IV	13th
1979–80	Landesliga Bayern-Nord	IV	10th
1980–81	Landesliga Bayern-Nord	IV	16th ↓

- The 1944–45 Gauliga Bayern season operated in five regional divisions. The Lower Franconia (German: Unterfranken) division was made up from four clubs: 1. FC Schweinfurt 05, VfR 07 Schweinfurt, FV 04 Würzburg, and Würzburger Kickers. It is unknown whether any of the season's games were played.

↑ Promoted	↓ Relegated

== German Cup appearances ==
The club's appearances in German Cup (Tschammerpokal):

Season	Round	Date	Home	Away	Result	Attendance
1940	First round	18 August 1940	VfR 07 Schweinfurt	Mühlheimer SV 06	2–1 (a.e.t.)	3,000
1940	Second round	15 September 1940	SK Rapid Wien	VfR 07 Schweinfurt	7–1	8,000

== Notable past players ==
- (Germany) Robert Bernard (MF)
- (Germany) Andreas Kupfer (MF)
