= Sachs-Stadion =

Football stadium in Schweinfurt, Germany

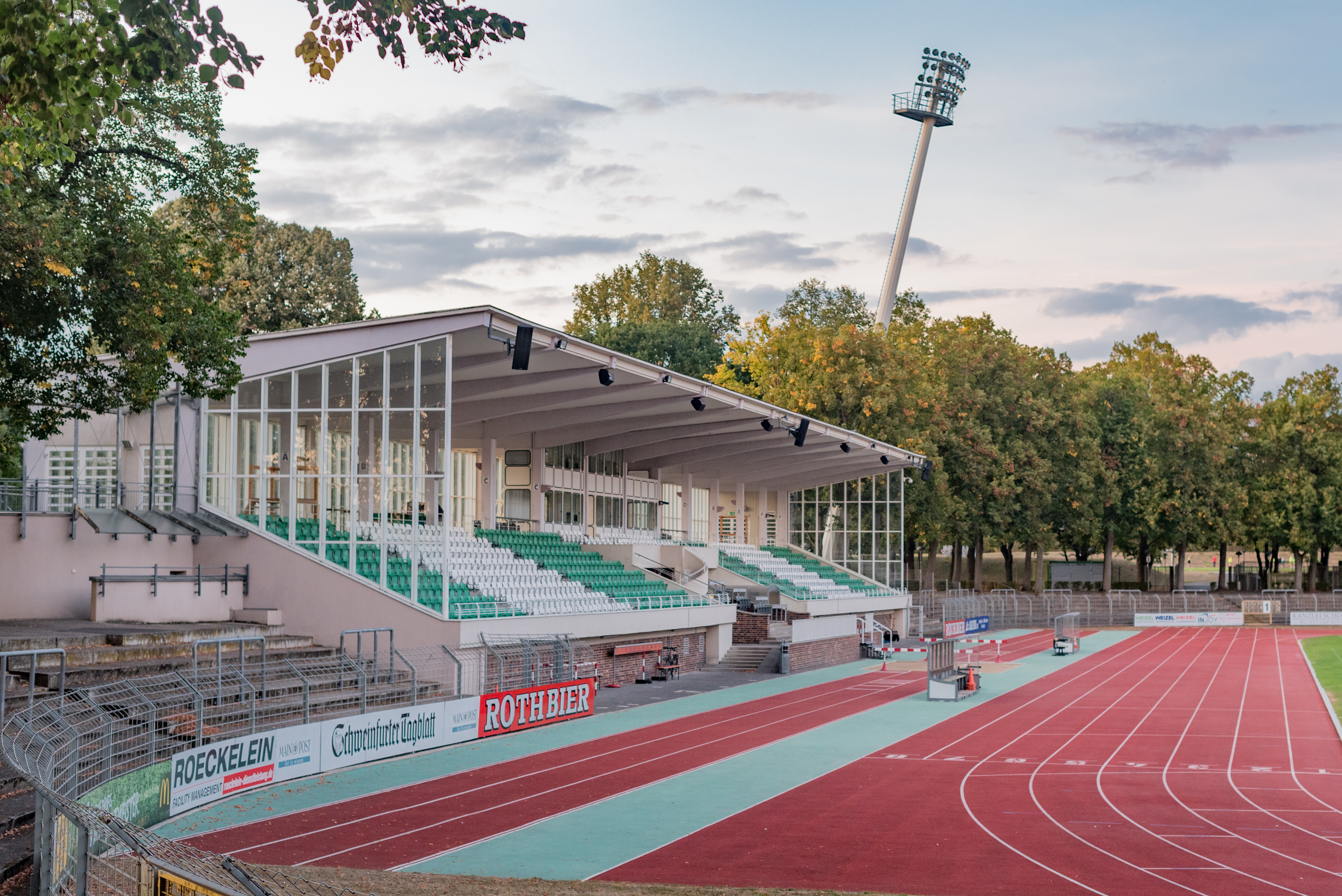
- Interactive map of Sachs-Stadion
- Full name: Riedel Bau Arena im Sachs-Stadion
- Former names: Willy-Sachs-Stadion (1936–2021)
- Location: Schweinfurt, Germany
- Coordinates: 50°3′4.6″N 10°12′10.9″E
- Owner: City of Schweinfurt
- Capacity: 14,718 (860 seated)
- Surface: Grass
- Field size: 105 m × 68 m

Construction
- Built: 1934 to 1936
- Opened: 23 July 1936
- Renovated: 2001, 2014, 2025
- Cost: 1 million RM
- Architect: Paul Bonatz

Tenants
- 1. FC Schweinfurt 05; TSV Großbardorf (2008–09)

Sachs-Stadion (formerly known as Willy-Sachs-Stadion, for sponsorship reasons Riedel Bau Arena im Sachs-Stadion) is a multi-functional football stadium in Schweinfurt, Germany. Since 1936, it has been home stadium to the German football club 1. FC Schweinfurt 05.

== History ==
The stadium, built by German architect Paul Bonatz, was a donation from local industrialist Willy Sachs to the City of Schweinfurt. As the club's patron, Willy Sachs designated a privileged right of use of all facilities for 1. FC Schweinfurt 05. Leading politicians of Nazi Germany attended the opening ceremony on 23 July 1936. Three days later, the new Willy-Sachs-Stadion saw its first game, a 2–2 draw between 1. FC Schweinfurt 05 and 1935 German champion FC Schalke 04.

The stadium has been top-tier venue all the time between 1936 and 1963, and was home stadium to second-tier football for many of the following years, most recently during the 2001–02 season. In addition, from 1939 on Schweinfurt 05 played a larger number of German Cup matches at the stadium. Attendance record of the stadium was 22,500 at a friendly between Schweinfurt 05 and 1. FC Kaiserslautern in 1954.

The sports venue hosted the 2nd Fistball World Championships in 1972 as well as the Fistball European Championships in 2012. During the 2006 FIFA World Cup in Germany, the stadium served as training ground for the Tunisia national football team. In the 2008–09 season, nearby football club TSV Großbardorf had to move to Schweinfurt due to Regionalliga legislations on stadium capacity. The sports complex regularly is venue for athletics competitions and championships on national level. Occasionally, the neighbouring U.S. Army Garrison, located in Schweinfurt until 2014, had used the stadium for military parades.

Today the stadium is listed as historic monument and is thus subject to preservation orders. As part of the Schweinfurt Lest we forget initiative, in 2001 the local press including Süddeutsche Zeitung and author Werner Skrentny initiated a campaign to rename the Willy-Sachs-Stadion due to Sachs' Nazi affiliation. The campaign met with low approval among the general public. In June 2021, however, the Schweinfurt city council finally decided to change the name of the stadium into Sachs-Stadion, in recognition of the value of the former Fichtel & Sachs company (now part of ZF Friedrichshafen) for the development of Schweinfurt. In the 2025–26 3. Liga season, Schweinfurt's venue was renamed to Riedel Bau Arena im Sachs-Stadion for sponsorship reasons.

== Facilities ==
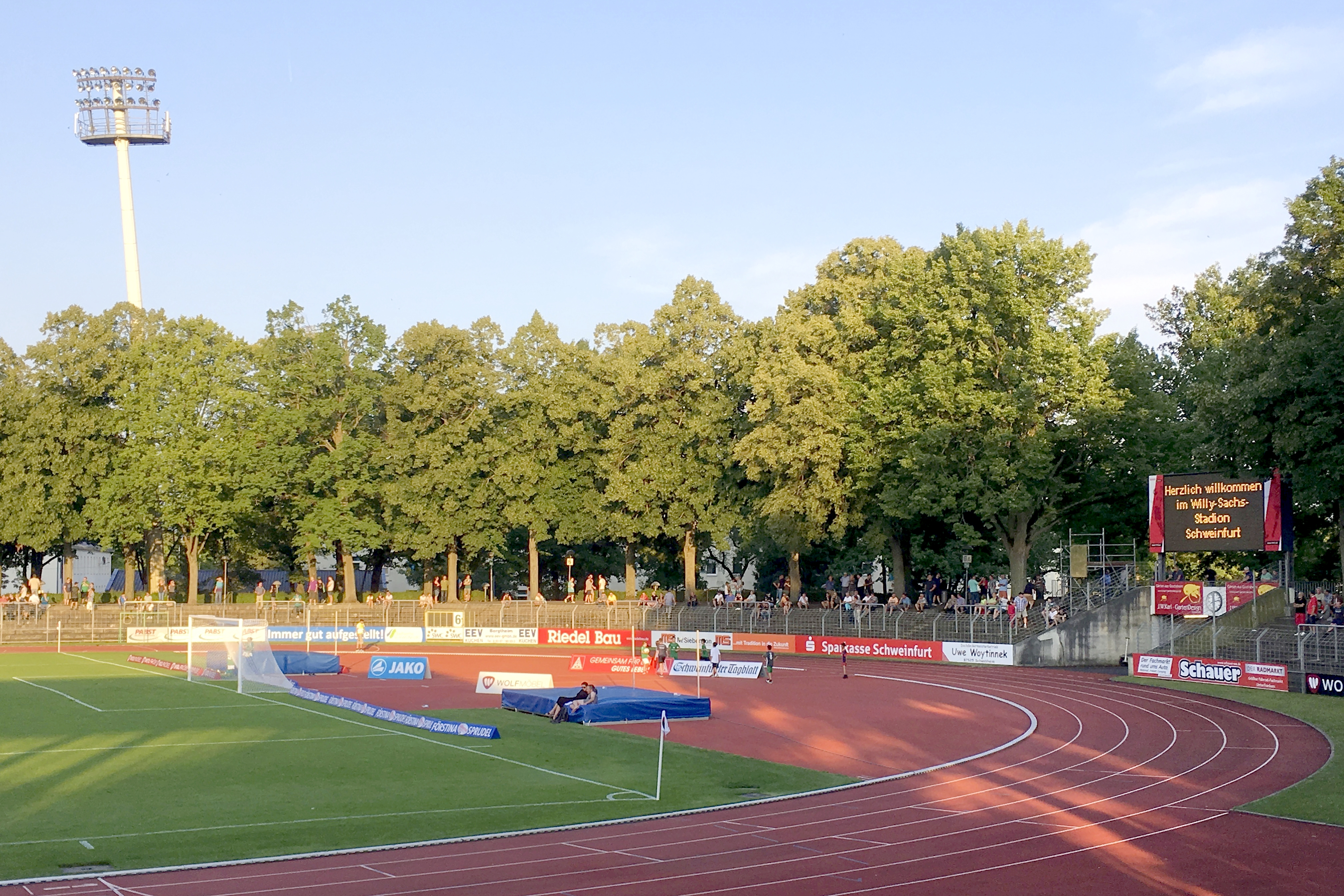
Standing rooms with Marathon gate (2017)

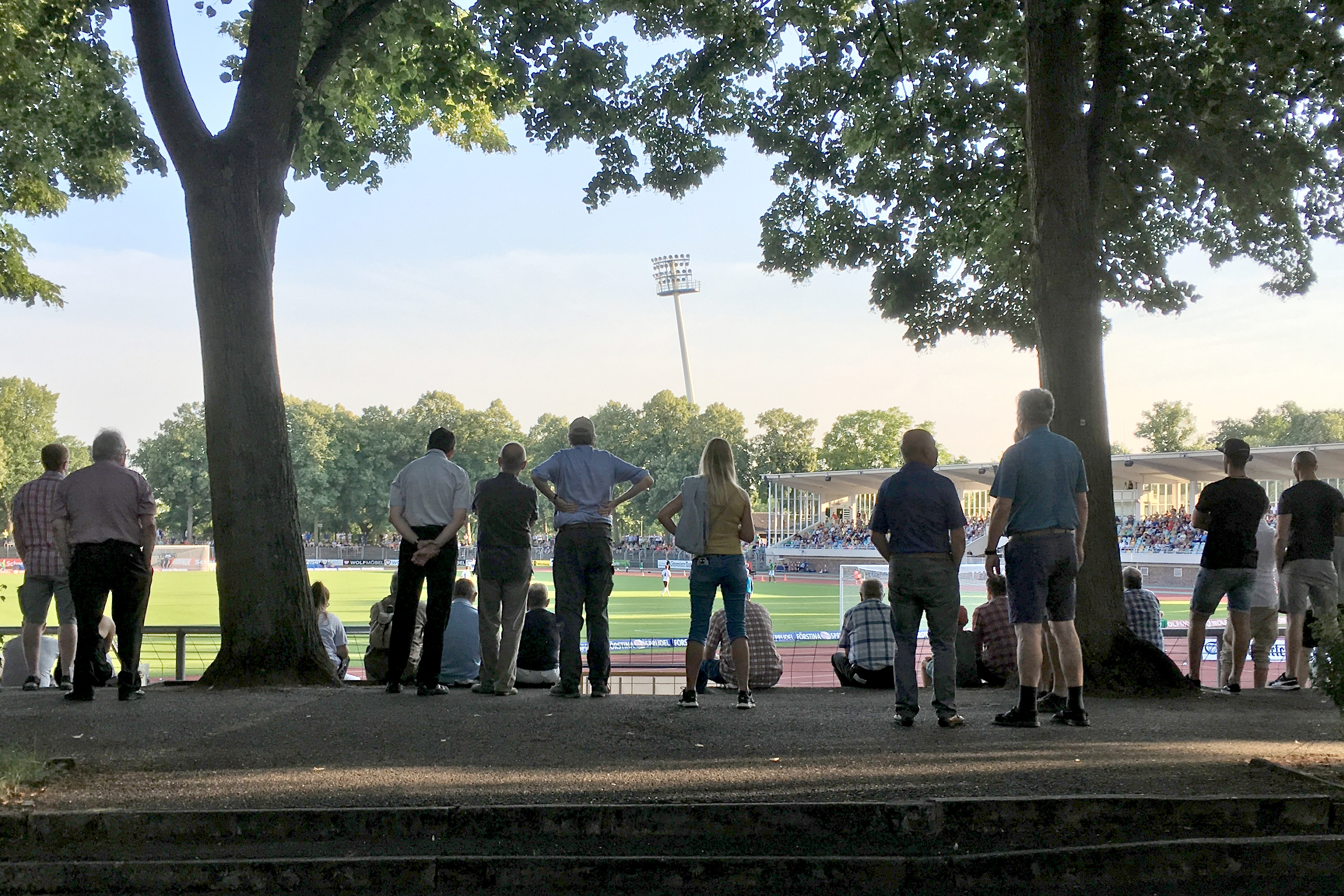
View onto court and grandstand (2017)

The stadium complex consists of the main field with a capacity of 14,718 (the actual Sachs-Stadion) and several additional courts for training and youth matches, including an artificial turf pitch. The main stadium features a covered grandstand with 860 seats and additional standing areas around the remaining perimeter, which is lined with two rows of linden trees. The football field is flanked by various track and field facilities, and a classical Marathon gate. Premises at the stadium include changing rooms for players, coaches, and referees. Speaker cabins and a press area are available in the grandstand.

To meet 2nd Bundesliga regulations, in 2001 terracing has been renovated, and the stadium was equipped with floodlight masts. In addition, Schweinfurt's large industry contributed an electronic scoreboard, that was replaced in 2022 by a 30 sqm LED screen. Due to increased security standards, wavebreakers had to be installed on the standing rooms in 2014 to safeguard the full capacity. In 2019, the grandstand was outfitted with new green and white seats that represent the colours of 1. FC Schweinfurt 05. In order to fulfill the DFB's requirements for FC Schweinfurt 05's 2025/26 third division season, the City of Schweinfurt and the club financed an under-soil heating system for the pitch, new LED floodlights, and a temporary expansion of seating capacity to a total of 2,000 seats.
