= Robert Bernard (footballer) =

German football player

Personal information
- Full name: Robert Bernard
- Date of birth: 10 March 1913
- Place of birth: Schweinfurt, Germany
- Date of death: 17 February 1990 (aged 76)
- Position: Half-back

Senior career*
Years	Team	Apps	(Gls)
1930–1946	VfR 07 Schweinfurt		
1946–1951	1. FC Schweinfurt 05		

International career
1936	Germany	2	(0)
- * Club domestic league appearances and goals

Robert Bernard (10 March 1913 – 17 February 1990) was a German football player.

Born in Schweinfurt, Robert Bernard was the son of Jakob Bernard, an esteemed footballer in the postwar area of World War I in Schweinfurt, and the father of Günter Bernard, who was part of the runner-up squad of Germany at the 1966 FIFA World Cup and a Bundesliga winner with Werder Bremen in 1965.

With his club VfR 07 Schweinfurt, which had a couple of top-tier Gauliga Bayern seasons at that time, Bernard made it into the second round of 1940 Tschammerpokal against 1938 cup winner and later German football champion SK Rapid Wien. In 1946, he joined the local competitor 1. FC Schweinfurt 05 for the rest of his career.

Robert Bernard played two times for Germany, both as fullback in the successive matches against Luxembourg (9–0) and Norway (0–2) at the 1936 Summer Olympics. The surprise defeat against Norway eliminated the host nation from the tournament and got coach Otto Nerz sacked. Nerz' successor Sepp Herberger, who later handed his son Günter caps for Germany, did not see use in playing Robert Bernard any further.
