= 1. FC Schweinfurt 05 =

German association football club

Coordinates: 50°3′4.6″N 10°12′10.9″E

- Full name: 1. Fussball-Club Schweinfurt 1905, Verein für Leibesübungen e.V.
- Nicknames: Die Schnüdel; Die Grün-Weißen
- Founded: 5 May 1905; 121 years ago
- Ground: Sachs-Stadion
- Capacity: 14,718 (860 seated)
- Chairman: Dominik Groß and Benjamin Liebald
- Manager: Jan Gernlein
- League: Regionalliga Bayern
- 2025–26: 3. Liga, 19th of 20 (relegated)
- Website: www.fcschweinfurt05.de
Home colours	Away colours	Third colours

1. Fussball-Club Schweinfurt 1905, Verein für Leibesübungen e.V., called 1. FC Schweinfurt 05, Schweinfurt 05, or simply FC 05, is a German association football club established in Schweinfurt (Bavaria) in 1905. Besides men’s and women‘s football, it also has a section for athletics.

The club is well known due to successful years in top and second-tier football leagues from the 1930s to the 1970s, and thanks to outstanding individuals. During the late 1930s, Schweinfurt's midfielders Albin Kitzinger and Andreas Kupfer, today considered as two of the best half-back players of all time, formed the core of the Germany national football team and represented their country at the 1938 FIFA World Cup and within the premiere FIFA continent selection Europe XI.

The FC 05 first team, which competes in the tier-four Regionalliga Bayern in the 2026–27 season, is organized within 1. FC Schweinfurt 1905 Fußball GmbH. The club plays its home games at Sachs-Stadion in Schweinfurt.

== History ==
=== Early years: 1905–1931 ===
1. FC Schweinfurt 05 team in 1905

At a time when football became more and more popular among broad levels of the population, 1. Fussball-Club Schweinfurt 1905 was founded on 5 May 1905 by a group of sports enthusiasts. The club's first chairman, Pepi Popp, designed the still unchanged FC 05 crest.

The new team played in various local leagues until beginning of the First World War. The home games were held at Hutrasen south of river Main, the later venue of local competitor VfR 07 Schweinfurt. In 1919, Schweinfurt 05 had to move to a new court near Ludwigsbrücke and became member of the tier-one Kreisliga Nordbayern, but relegated after its first season. The team attempted a merger with Turngemeinde Schweinfurt von 1848, which lasted from 1921 to 1923, before the two groups parted ways again and the football division became 1. Fussball-Club Schweinfurt 1905, Verein für Leibesübungen e.V.

While FC 05 did not reap the expected benefits from the brief union, it improved dramatically after re-establishing itself as an independent club. Membership grew significantly and a number of new sports departments were formed within the organization. The football team yielded its first fruits in 1927 by winning the Unterfranken Cup championship, and in 1931, when it became Kreisliga Unterfranken champion.

=== Years of excellence: 1931–1963 ===
Schweinfurt 05 finally gained first class status again with its entry into the Bezirksliga Bayern in 1931. After introduction of the Gauliga system in 1933, the club became member of the top-flight Gauliga Bayern thanks to finishing 3rd in Bezirksliga Bayern Nord. In addition, the team succeeded in winning the 1933 Bavarian Cup championship, but lost 1–2 to VfB Stuttgart in the subsequent Southern German Cup final.

The club experienced an era of successful seasons in the Gauliga years, winning the Gauliga Bayern in 1939 and 1942, and qualifying for the German football championship round. In the German football championship 1939 competition, Schweinfurt barely missed the semi-final qualification games after three wins in the group stage, where it defeated later 1943 and 1944 German champion Dresdner SC 1–0 in the first leg, but then lost to Dresden 0–1 in the decisive away match. The team failed in the round of 16 of the 1942 German football championship after a 1–2 loss to SG SS Straßburg.

Schweinfurt made a semi-final appearance in the 1936 Tschammerpokal, when it was defeated 2–3 by FC Schalke 04, the closest it ever came to winning a national title. Again in 1936, the club moved into its newly constructed stadium, the Willy-Sachs-Stadion (today: Sachs-Stadion), a donation by local industrialist and patron Willy Sachs.

At that time, FC 05 midfielders Albin Kitzinger and Andreas 'Ander' Kupfer became renowned in international football as they formed one of the best half-back duos in Europe. Kitzinger distinguished himself with assuredness on the ball and the calmness in which he distributed the ball. Kupfer was a player that fascinated the crowds with his elegant ways of playing. He was a master of kicking the ball with just moving his ankle joint. Kitzinger and Kupfer were an essential part of the famous Germany national team who defeated Denmark 8–0 in Breslau on 16 May 1937. One year later they competed at the 1938 FIFA World Cup in France, and were both called up to represent Germany within the FIFA selection Europe XI in the FA 75th anniversary game against England at Highbury in London.

Due to the Second World War, Schweinfurt 05 merged with Luftwaffen SV Schweinfurt into KSG Schweinfurt for the 1943–44 and 1944–45 Gauliga seasons. The club temporarily had been dissolved in May 1945 under pressure from the occupying powers.

After World War II, the re-established 1. FC Schweinfurt 05 was integrated into the tier-one Oberliga Süd, which, for the first time in German football, introduced the system of contract players in August 1948. The club stayed in the Oberliga for the duration of the league's existence until the Bundesliga, Germany's new professional league, was founded in 1963. Schweinfurt reached the round of the last sixteen of the 1954–55 DFB-Pokal, where it lost 0–1 in the replay against FC Schalke 04 after a 1–1 draw in the first match. On the occasion of the club's 50th anniversary in 1955, Schweinfurt could demonstrate its level when the team defeated German champion Rot-Weiss Essen 3–1, and achieved a 1–1 draw against Everton F.C. from English Football League First Division. The club made it into the 1957 and 1958 Southern German Cup finals and lost both times, to FC Bayern Munich and to VfB Stuttgart, respectively.

In 1950, Andreas Kupfer became the first captain of the West Germany national football team in his very final 44th appearance. FC 05 goalkeeper Günter Bernard earned two West Germany caps in 1962, before he joined Bundesliga founding member SV Werder Bremen one year later, and was named in Germany's squad for the 1966 FIFA World Cup.

=== Second tier years: 1963–1976 ===
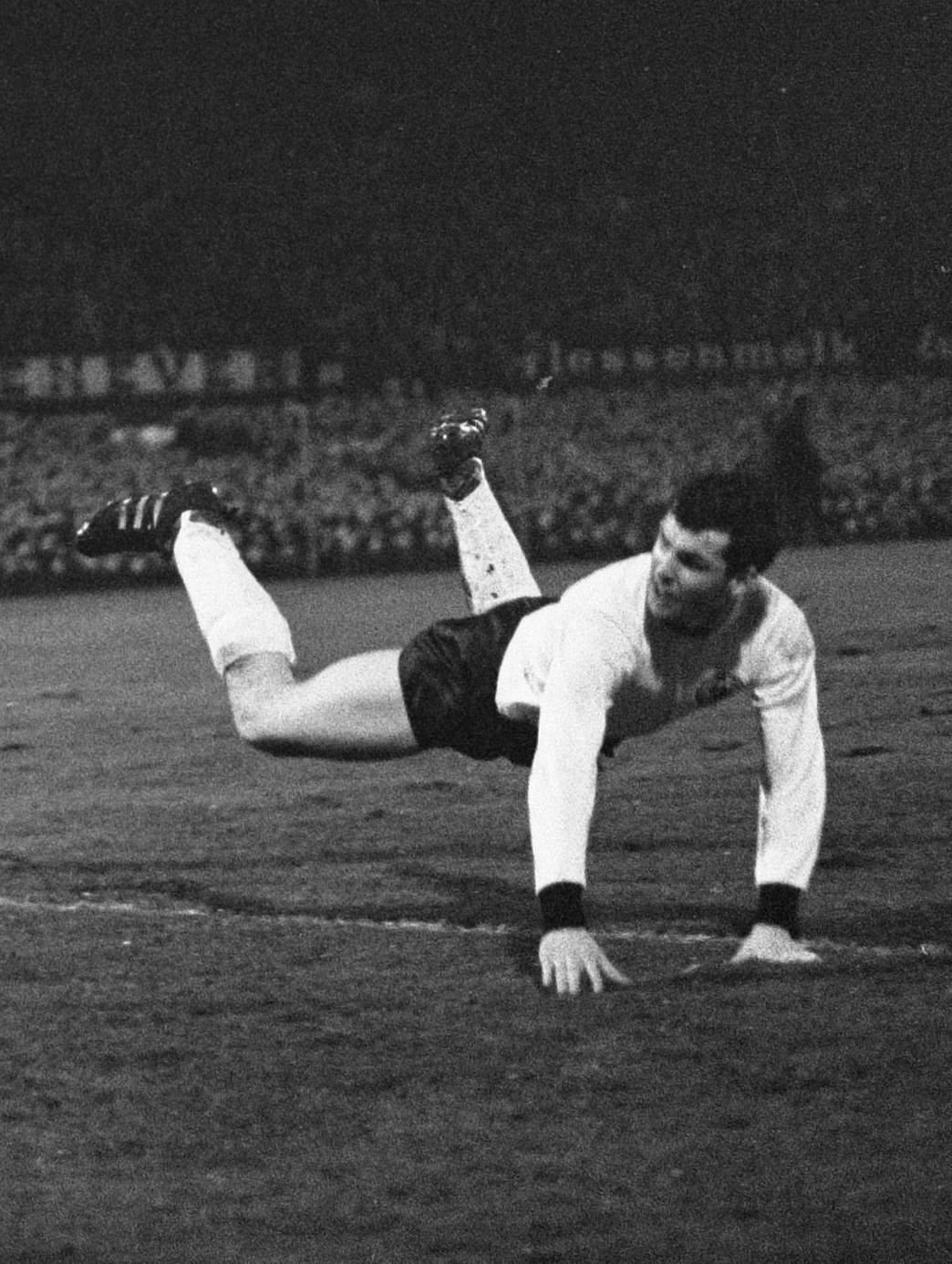
Lothar Emmerich

1. FC Schweinfurt 05 was one of 46 West German football clubs that applied for admission to the newly established Bundesliga in 1963. However, based on the Oberliga Süd score of its past 12 seasons, the club finally did not qualify for the new league, and thus found itself playing in the second tier Regionalliga Süd.

In the 1965–66 season, Schweinfurt became Southern German Regionalliga champion and made it to the Bundesliga advancement games. Here, the team missed to ascend to the top tier after it was unable to prevail in its qualification group with 1. FC Saarbrücken, FC St. Pauli, and promoted winner Rot-Weiss Essen.

With the introduction of the 2. Bundesliga in 1974, Schweinfurt was founding member of the southern division despite only finishing 15th in the last Regionalliga year. For its first 2. Bundesliga season in 1974–75, the club signed-up former national team striker and Bundesliga top scorer Lothar Emmerich. The team earned an excellent third place and barely missed the advancement games for promotion to Bundesliga.

=== Yo-yo years: 1976–2016 ===
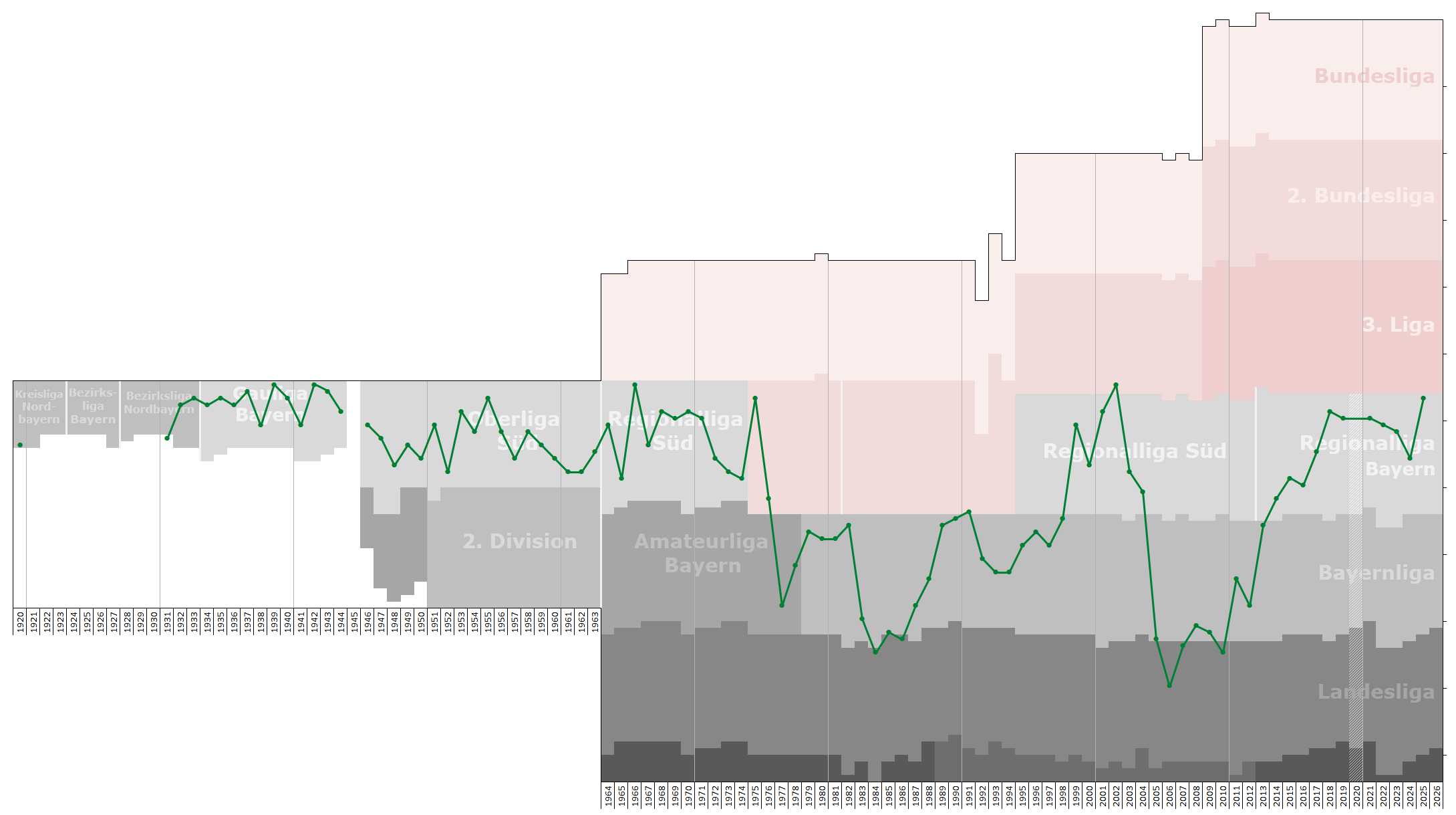
Historical chart of the 1. FC Schweinfurt 05 league performance

After the 1974–75 season, FC 05 began to falter: poor results and financial problems saw the club descend first to the Bayernliga (III) and then, for the first time in 1983, to the Landesliga Bayern-Nord (IV). Schweinfurt 05 became a yo-yo club ascending and descending between tiers III and IV, with just a pair of brief 2. Bundesliga appearances in 1990–91 and in 2001–02.

As 1989–90 Bayernliga champion the club prevailed in the advancement games to 2. Bundesliga, but was not able to keep pace in the new league. The year before, the team had made it into the last sixteen of the 1989–90 DFB-Pokal, where it lost 0–2 to Eintracht Braunschweig. In 2001, Schweinfurt was promoted to 2. Bundesliga after finishing 3rd in Regionalliga Süd. The team's third-place finish was enough to let them skip past the amateur side of VfB Stuttgart, who were not allowed to advance a second side to the professional ranks. Despite a decent first half of the tier-two season, FC 05 finally could not avoid relegation after one year.

Disasters happened in 2004 when FC Schweinfurt 05 was forced to leave the Regionalliga Süd (III) because of financial reasons, and in 2005 when the club went bankrupt. The results in the Bayernliga (IV) were annulled, and the team was relegated to the fifth tier Landesliga.

A re-structured club successfully worked its way back into Bayernliga in 2007. After it was relegated again to the now tier-six Landesliga in 2009, the team returned to the Bayernliga immediately the following year. At the end of the 2011–12 season Schweinfurt managed to qualify for the promotion round to the new Regionalliga Bayern (IV) and advanced to the second round, where the team missed out on promotion. The club finally earned direct promotion to tier-four Regionalliga Bayern in the 2012–13 season by taking the championship in the Bayernliga northern division. Schweinfurt's first three Regionalliga years, however, were characterized by a permanent but successful struggle against relegation.

=== Consolidation years: 2016–today ===
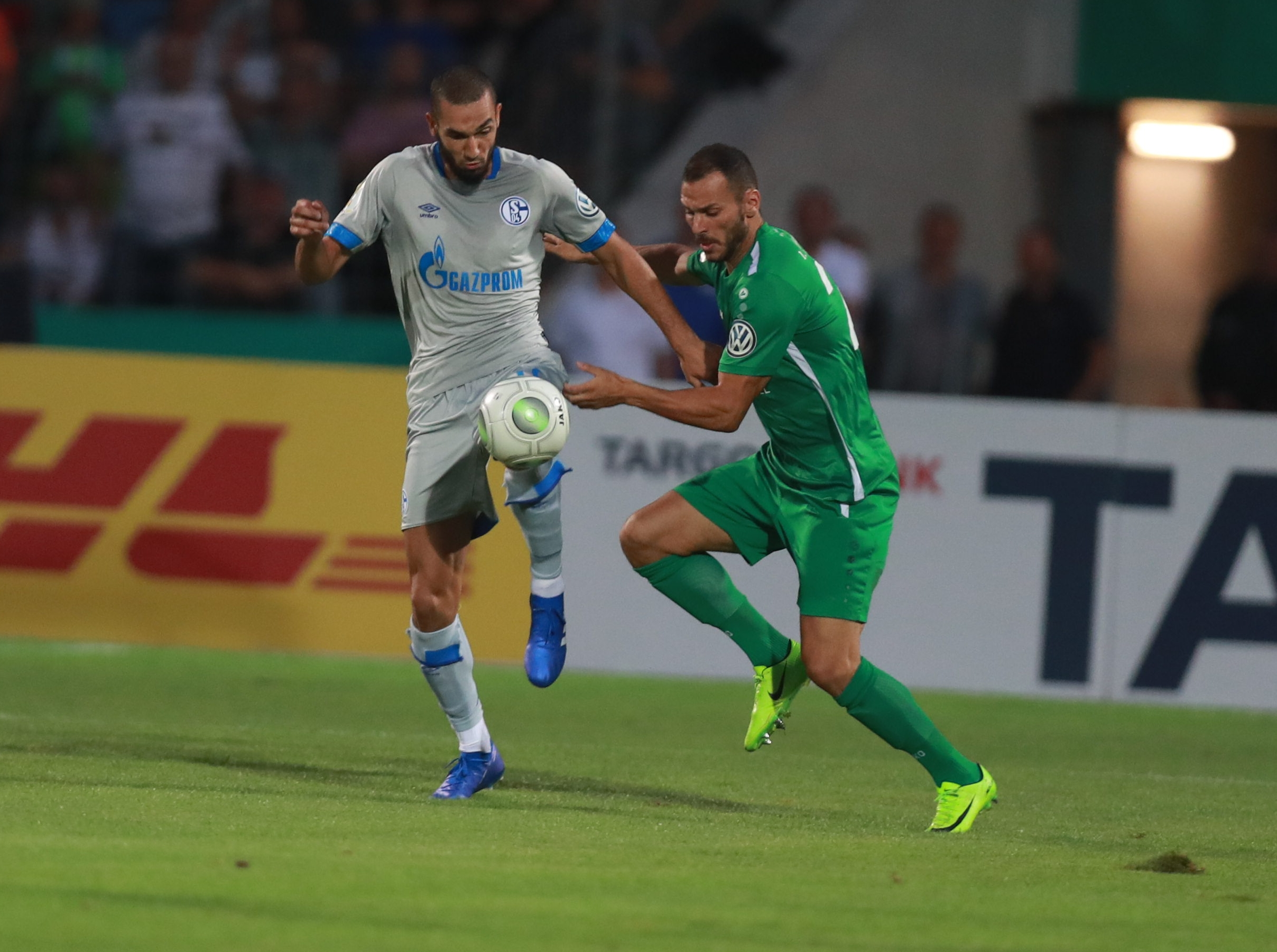
2018–19 DFB-Pokal: Nabil Bentaleb (FC Schalke 04) and Adam Jabiri (FC Schweinfurt 05)

In 2016, the FC 05 first team was spun off into 1. FC Schweinfurt 1905 Fußball GmbH. By means of the reorganization, the club again established professional structures to pave the way back to higher leagues.

Schweinfurt experienced an upturn in the 2016–17 season and finished 8th in the Regionalliga Bayern. In addition, the team succeeded in winning the Bavarian Cup after a 1–0 victory over Wacker Burghausen in the final. In the 2017–18 Regionalliga, Schweinfurt were unable to match the champions TSV 1860 München, and finished 3rd. Schweinfurt defeated 2. Bundesliga club SV Sandhausen 2–1 in the 2017–18 DFB-Pokal first round, but then lost 4–0 to the eventual winners, Eintracht Frankfurt. In the same season, Schweinfurt successfully defended the Bavarian Cup after a 3–1 victory over SpVgg Bayreuth in the final. Schweinfurt finished 4th in the 2018–19 Regionalliga. In the 2018–19 DFB-Pokal first round, the team lost 2–0 to the previous season's Bundesliga runner-up, Schalke.

Due to the COVID-19 pandemic in Germany, the original 2019–20 Regionalliga Bayern season was extended until spring 2021, and the 2020–21 season was cancelled. In July 2020, the league leaders Türkgücü München were promoted to the 3. Liga, while Schweinfurt, as runners-up, qualified for the 2020–21 DFB-Pokal. In the first round cup match, Schweinfurt were defeated 4–1, again by Bundesliga club Schalke. Schweinfurt managed to win the championship of the finally discontinued 2019–21 Regionalliga Bayern when the club prevailed in a play-off group of the top three eligible teams, with Viktoria Aschaffenburg and SpVgg Bayreuth. However, Schweinfurt missed out on promotion to the 3. Liga after a 2–0 defeat on aggregate in the play-offs against TSV Havelse from the Regionalliga Nord. The team finished in the top half of the table in the following two Regionalliga Bayern seasons.

In the 2023–24 season, Schweinfurt regained amateur status for financial reasons, and finished 11th in Regionalliga Bayern. However, the team won the division the following year to promote to the 3. Liga, and thus returned to a professional football league after 23 years in lower divisions. Despite the addition of several new players with first- and second-division experience, Schweinfurt were unable to compete in the new league and were relegated back to the Regionalliga after just one season. In the 2025–26 DFB-Pokal first round, the team was defeated 2–4 by 2. Bundesliga club Fortuna Düsseldorf.

== Seasons ==
=== First team ===
The season-by-season performance of the club from 1931 until today:

Season	Division	Tier	Position
1931–32	Bezirksliga Bayern (Nord)	I	4th
1932–33	Bezirksliga Bayern (Nord)	I	3rd
1933–34	Gauliga Bayern	I	4th
1934–35	Gauliga Bayern	I	3rd
1935–36	Gauliga Bayern	I	4th
1936–37	Gauliga Bayern	I	2nd
1937–38	Gauliga Bayern	I	7th
1938–39	Gauliga Bayern	I	1st
1939–40	Gauliga Bayern	I	3rd
1940–41	Gauliga Bayern	I	7th
1941–42	Gauliga Bayern	I	1st
1942–43	Gauliga Nordbayern	I	2nd
1943–44	Gauliga Nordbayern	I	5th
1944–45	Gauliga Bayern	I	no results
1945–46	Oberliga Süd	I	7th
1946–47	Oberliga Süd	I	9th
1947–48	Oberliga Süd	I	13th
1948–49	Oberliga Süd	I	10th
1949–50	Oberliga Süd	I	12th
1950–51	Oberliga Süd	I	7th
1951–52	Oberliga Süd	I	14th
1952–53	Oberliga Süd	I	5th
1953–54	Oberliga Süd	I	8th
1954–55	Oberliga Süd	I	3rd
1955–56	Oberliga Süd	I	8th
1956–57	Oberliga Süd	I	12th
1957–58	Oberliga Süd	I	8th
1958–59	Oberliga Süd	I	10th
1959–60	Oberliga Süd	I	12th
1960–61	Oberliga Süd	I	14th
1961–62	Oberliga Süd	I	14th
1962–63	Oberliga Süd	I	11th
1963–64	Regionalliga Süd	II	7th
1964–65	Regionalliga Süd	II	15th
1965–66	Regionalliga Süd	II	1st
1966–67	Regionalliga Süd	II	10th
1967–68	Regionalliga Süd	II	5th
1968–69	Regionalliga Süd	II	6th
1969–70	Regionalliga Süd	II	5th
1970–71	Regionalliga Süd	II	6th
1971–72	Regionalliga Süd	II	12th
1972–73	Regionalliga Süd	II	14th
1973–74	Regionalliga Süd	II	15th
1974–75	2. Bundesliga Süd	II	3rd
1975–76	2. Bundesliga Süd	II	18th ↓
1976–77	Bayernliga	III	14th
1977–78	Bayernliga	III	8th
1978–79	Bayernliga	III	3rd
1979–80	Bayernliga	III	4th
1980–81	Bayernliga	III	4th
1981–82	Bayernliga	III	2nd
1982–83	Bayernliga	III	16th ↓
1983–84	Landesliga Bayern-Nord	IV	1st ↑
1984–85	Bayernliga	III	18th ↓
1985–86	Landesliga Bayern-Nord	IV	1st ↑
1986–87	Bayernliga	III	14th
1987–88	Bayernliga	III	10th
1988–89	Bayernliga	III	2nd
1989–90	Bayernliga	III	1st ↑
1990–91	2. Bundesliga	II	20th ↓
1991–92	Bayernliga	III	7th
1992–93	Bayernliga	III	9th
1993–94	Bayernliga	III	9th
1994–95	Bayernliga	IV	5th
1995–96	Bayernliga	IV	3rd
1996–97	Bayernliga	IV	5th
1997–98	Bayernliga	IV	1st ↑
1998–99	Regionalliga Süd	III	5th
1999–2000	Regionalliga Süd	III	11th
2000–01	Regionalliga Süd	III	3rd ↑
2001–02	2. Bundesliga	II	17th ↓
2002–03	Regionalliga Süd	III	12th
2003–04	Regionalliga Süd	III	15th ↓
2004–05	Bayernliga	IV	19th ↓
2005–06	Landesliga Bayern-Nord	V	7th
2006–07	Landesliga Bayern-Nord	V	1st ↑
2007–08	Bayernliga	IV	16th
2008–09	Bayernliga	V	17th ↓
2009–10	Landesliga Bayern-Nord	VI	2nd ↑
2010–11	Bayernliga	V	9th
2011–12	Bayernliga	V	13th
2012–13	Bayernliga Nord	V	1st ↑
2013–14	Regionalliga Bayern	IV	16th
2014–15	Regionalliga Bayern	IV	13th
2015–16	Regionalliga Bayern	IV	14th
2016–17	Regionalliga Bayern	IV	8th
2017–18	Regionalliga Bayern	IV	3rd
2018–19	Regionalliga Bayern	IV	4th
2019–21	Regionalliga Bayern	IV	1st
2021–22	Regionalliga Bayern	IV	5th
2022–23	Regionalliga Bayern	IV	6th
2023–24	Regionalliga Bayern	IV	11th
2024–25	Regionalliga Bayern	IV	1st ↑
2025–26	3. Liga	III	19th ↓

- The 1944–45 Gauliga Bayern season operated in five regional divisions. It is unknown whether any of the season's games were played in the Lower Franconia (German: Unterfranken) division.
- With the introduction of the Bezirksoberligas in 1988 as the new fifth tier, below the Landesligas, all leagues below dropped one tier. With the introduction of the Regionalligas in 1994 and the 3. Liga in 2008 as the new third tier, below the 2. Bundesliga, all leagues below dropped one tier. With the establishment of the Regionalliga Bayern as the new fourth tier in Bavaria in 2012 the Bayernliga was split into a northern and a southern division, the number of Landesligas expanded from three to five and the Bezirksoberligas were abolished. All leagues from the Bezirksligas onward were elevated one tier.
- The 2020–21 Regionalliga Bayern season has been cancelled due to the COVID-19 pandemic in Germany, and the original 2019–20 season was extended until spring 2021. In July 2020, the current league leader Türkgücü München was promoted to the 3. Liga and thus suspended from 2019–21 Regionalliga Bayern, and the club's league results have all been annulled. The 2019–21 Regionalliga Bayern champion and participant in the promotion play-offs against the champions of the 2020–21 Regionalliga Nord was determined end of the discontinued season in a double round-robin play-off series with the top three eligible teams Viktoria Aschaffenburg, SpVgg Bayreuth, and 1. FC Schweinfurt 05.

=== Reserve team ===
The recent season-by-season performance of the U23 reserve. After the 2017–18 season, the team had been pulled out from future league participation.

Season	Division	Tier	Position
2011–12	Kreisliga Schweinfurt 1	VIII	9th
2012–13	Kreisliga Schweinfurt 1	VIII	1st ↑
2013–14	Bezirksliga Unterfranken-Ost	VII	1st ↑
2014–15	Landesliga Bayern-Nordwest	VI	5th
2015–16	Landesliga Bayern-Nordwest	VI	3rd
2016–17	Landesliga Bayern-Nordwest	VI	1st ↑
2017–18	Bayernliga Nord	V	16th ↓

=== Key ===
↑ Promoted	↓ Relegated

== German football championship appearances ==
The club's appearances in German football championship competitions:

Season	Round	Date	Home	Away	Result	Attendance
1939	Group stage	10 April 1939	Warnsdorfer FK	1. FC Schweinfurt 05	1–4	4,000
1939	Group stage	16 April 1939	1. FC Schweinfurt 05	Dresdner SC	1–0	15,000
1939	Group stage	30 April 1939	1. FC Schweinfurt 05	Warnsdorfer FK	4–2	6,000
1939	Group stage	7 May 1939	Dresdner SC^{*}	1. FC Schweinfurt 05	1–0	40,000
1942	Last sixteen	24 May 1942	SG SS Straßburg	1. FC Schweinfurt 05	2–1	12,000

^{*} Dresdner SC finished top of the group, level on points with Schweinfurt, due to better scoring

== DFB-Pokal appearances ==
The club's appearances in Tschammerpokal (until 1943) and DFB-Pokal:

Season	Round	Date	Home	Away	Result	Attendance
1935	First round	1 September 1935	1. FC Schweinfurt 05	SV 08 Steinach	4–0	1,500
1935	Second round	22 September 1935	PSV Chemnitz	1. FC Schweinfurt 05	4–2	7,000
1936	First round	14 June 1936	1. FC Schweinfurt 05	FC Hanau 93	4–0	2,000
1936	Second round	28 June 1936	1. FC Schweinfurt 05	SV 1898 Feuerbach	5–2	1,500
1936	Last sixteen	6 September 1936	TSG Ulm 1846	1. FC Schweinfurt 05	2–4	3,000
1936	Quarter-finals	25 October 1936	SV Waldhof Mannheim	1. FC Schweinfurt 05	1–2	10,000
1936	Semi-finals	8 November 1936	FC Schalke 04	1. FC Schweinfurt 05	3–2	7,000
1939	First round	20 August 1939	1. FC Schweinfurt 05	SC Wacker Wien	2–3 (a.e.t.)	2,500
1942	First round	20 July 1942	FC Hanau 93	1. FC Schweinfurt 05	2–1	2,000
1943	First round	12 September 1943^{*}	KSG Schweinfurt	1. FC Nürnberg	2–4	5,000
1954–55	First round	15 August 1954	Tennis Borussia Berlin	1. FC Schweinfurt 05	2–4	20,000
1954–55	Last sixteen	26 September 1954	FC Schalke 04	1. FC Schweinfurt 05	1–1 (a.e.t.)	5,000
1954–55	Last sixteen	7 October 1954	1. FC Schweinfurt 05	FC Schalke 04	0–1^{†}	7,000
1967–68	First round	27 January 1968	1. FC Schweinfurt 05	Eintracht Frankfurt	1–2 (a.e.t.)	10,000
1968–69	First round	22 January 1969	Arminia Hannover	1. FC Schweinfurt 05	4–0	3,174
1971–72	First round	4 December 1971	1. FC Schweinfurt 05	Eintracht Frankfurt	1–0	10,000
1971–72	First round	15 December 1971	Eintracht Frankfurt	1. FC Schweinfurt 05	6–1^{‡}	3,000
1974–75	First round	7 September 1974	1. FC Schweinfurt 05	1. FC Kaiserslautern	3–4	14,000
1975–76	First round	2 August 1975	Tennis Borussia Berlin	1. FC Schweinfurt 05	2–0	3,000
1976–77	First round	7 August 1976	1. FC Schweinfurt 05	FV Hassia Bingen	2–3	2,000
1989–90	First round	19 August 1989	1. FC Schweinfurt 05	Altonaer FC 93	1–0	2,100
1989–90	Second round	23 September 1989	1. FC Schweinfurt 05	Blau-Weiß 90 Berlin	4–2	6,500
1989–90	Last sixteen	11 November 1989	1. FC Schweinfurt 05	Eintracht Braunschweig	0–2	12,000
1991–92	First round	27 July 1991	1. FC Schweinfurt 05	SV Waldhof Mannheim	1–6	2,300
1996–97	First round	10 August 1996	1. FC Schweinfurt 05	Hansa Rostock	2–5	5,000
2002–03	First round	30 August 2002	1. FC Schweinfurt 05	1. FC Union Berlin	1–2 (a.e.t.)	2,500
2017–18	First round	13 August 2017	1. FC Schweinfurt 05	SV Sandhausen	2–1	4,610
2017–18	Second round	24 October 2017	1. FC Schweinfurt 05	Eintracht Frankfurt	0–4	15,060
2018–19	First round	17 August 2018	1. FC Schweinfurt 05	FC Schalke 04	0–2	15,060
2020–21	First round	3 November 2020^{#}	1. FC Schweinfurt 05	FC Schalke 04	1–4	0
2025–26	First round	18 August 2025	1. FC Schweinfurt 05	Fortuna Düsseldorf	2–4	10,684

^{*} Originally scheduled on 22 August 1943, but adjourned after the allied air-raid on Schweinfurt on 17 August 1943.
^{†} Replay
^{‡} Eintracht Frankfurt won 6–2 on aggregate.
^{#} Originally scheduled on 13 September 2020, but postponed after a legal challenge of Türkgücü München regarding the spot allocated to the representative of the Regionalliga Bayern. Due to the impact of the COVID-19 pandemic in Germany and the organisational effort required to host the fixture, Schweinfurt's home leg was held at Veltins-Arena in Gelsenkirchen, and without spectators.

== Honours ==
=== League ===
- German football championship
  - Last sixteen: 1942
- Oberliga Süd (I)
  - Third: 1954–55
- Gauliga Bayern (I)
  - Champions: (2) 1938–39, 1941–42
  - Runners-up: (2) 1936–37, 1942–43^{†}
- 2. Bundesliga Süd (II)
  - Third: 1974–75
- Regionalliga Süd (II)* (III)**
  - Champions: 1965–66*
  - Third: 2000–01**^{‡}
- Bayernliga (III)* (IV)**
  - Champions: (2) 1989–90*^{‡}, 1997–98**
  - Runners-up: (2) 1981–82*, 1988–89*
- Regionalliga Bayern (IV)
  - Champions: (2) 2019–21, 2024–25^{#}
- Bayernliga Nord (V)
  - Champions: 2012–13
- Landesliga Bayern-Nord (IV)* (V)** (VI)***
  - Champions: (3) 1983–84*, 1985–86*, 2006–07**
  - Runners-up: 2009–10***
- Landesliga Bayern-Nordwest (VI)
  - Champions: 2016–17^{§}

=== Cup ===
- German Cup/DFB-Pokal
  - Semi-finals: 1936
  - Last sixteen: (2) 1954–55, 1989–90
- Southern German Cup
  - Runners-up: (3) 1933, 1957, 1958
- Bavarian Cup
  - Winners: (3) 1933, 2016–17, 2017–18
- Unterfranken Cup
  - Winners: (5) 1927, 1963^{§}, 1996, 2006, 2009

=== Youth ===
- Bavarian Under 19 championship
  - Winners: (2) 2001, 2024
  - Runners-up: (4) 1961, 1966, 1968, 2021
- Bavarian Under 17 championship
  - Winners: 2005
  - Runners-up: 1995
- Bavarian Under 15 championship
  - Winners: 2003
  - Runners-up: (2) 1986, 1994

^{†} Northern division
^{‡} Promoted to 2. Bundesliga
^{#} Promoted to 3. Liga
^{§} Reserve team

== Stadium ==
=== Early grounds ===
In its first years, 1. FC Schweinfurt 05 played the home games at Hutrasen, the later ground of local competitor VfR 07 Schweinfurt. After the First World War, the club had to move to a court in close proximity, located at Ludwigsbrücke in Schweinfurt. With promotion to Gauliga Bayern in 1933, however, the existing venue proved to be more and more inadequate.

=== Sachs-Stadion ===
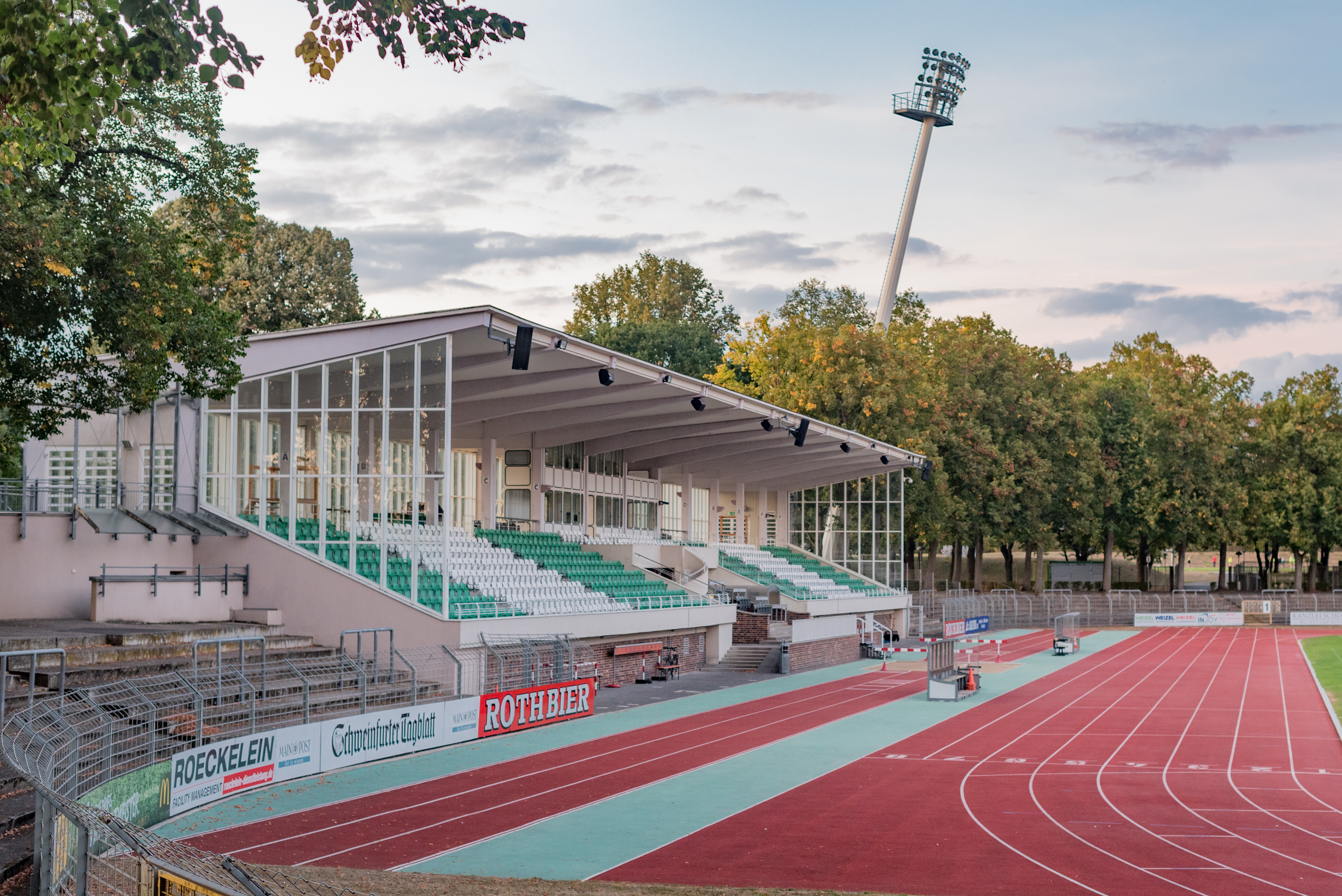
Sachs-Stadion grandstand (2019)

The club's necessity finally motivated local industrialist Willy Sachs to the donation of a football stadium to the City of Schweinfurt, where the patron designated a privileged right of use for FC Schweinfurt 05. The new Willy-Sachs-Stadion, built by German architect Paul Bonatz, was opened on 23 July 1936 in the presence of leading politicians of the Third Reich. The stadium saw its first game three days later with a 2–2 draw between Schweinfurt 05 and 1935 German champion FC Schalke 04. Attendance record was 22,500 at a friendly between Schweinfurt 05 and 1. FC Kaiserslautern in 1954.

Today, the stadium has a capacity of 14,718, where the grandstand hosts 860 covered seats. Besides the football field, the stadium offers track and field facilities, and is equipped with a classical Marathon gate. Premises at the stadium include changing rooms for players, coaches, and referees. Speaker cabins and a press area are available in the grandstand.

The stadium has been renovated and equipped with floodlights in 2001 in order to meet the requirements for 2. Bundesliga. In addition, an electronic scoreboard was contributed by Schweinfurt's large industry. Wavebreakers have been installed on the standing rooms in 2014 to safeguard the stadium's full capacity. In 2022, the old scoreboard was replaced by a new LED video display board. To pass the DFB's criteria for FC Schweinfurt 05's 2025–26 3. Liga season, the City of Schweinfurt and the club financed an under-soil heating system for the pitch, new LED floodlights, and a temporary expansion of seating capacity to a total of 2,000 seats.

The stadium is listed as historic monument and is thus subject to preservation orders. As a consequence of Willy Sachs' Nazi affiliation, in June 2021 the Schweinfurt city council decided to rename the sports venue into Sachs-Stadion, in recognition of the value of the former Fichtel & Sachs company for the development of Schweinfurt. In the 2025–26 3. Liga season, Schweinfurt's venue was renamed to Riedel Bau Arena im Sachs-Stadion for sponsorship reasons.

=== Proposed new stadium ===
Due to the club's ambitions to promote again to professional leagues with stricter legislations on stadium capacity and equipment, in 2018 the city administration commissioned a feasibility study for a new stadium to be realised in Schweinfurt. Two locations for a football arena with a capacity of 15,000 have been proposed by the German architectural office AS+P, one at former U.S. Conn Barracks, the other close to the existing venue.

== Players ==
=== Current squad ===
As of 9 November 2026

Note: Flags indicate national team as defined under FIFA eligibility rules; some limited exceptions apply. Players may hold more than one non-FIFA nationality.

No.	Pos.	Nation	Player
1	GK	GER	Julian Brätz
4	DF	GER	Kevin Frisorger
5	DF	GER	Johannes Theinhardt
6	DF	GER	Lukas Mrozek
7	MF	GER	Philipp Hack
8	MF	GER	Gil Ebner
9	FW	GER	Mirco Geisler
10	FW	GER	Michael Dellinger
11	MF	GER	Valentin Schmitt
13	MF	GER	Kristian Böhnlein
14	MF	GER	Martin Thomann
15	MF	GER	Kevin Fery
17	DF	GER	Jason Prodanović
18	DF	TUR	Esad Akgün

No.	Pos.	Nation	Player
19	DF	GER	Nils Piwernetz
20	MF	TUR	Alper Özden
21	MF	GER	Lauris Bausenwein
22	GK	GER	Jan Morshäuser
23	DF	GER	Pietro Besso
26	MF	GER	Nicolas Pfarr
27	MF	GER	Morris Adelabu
29	MF	GER	Leonard Krasniqi
32	MF	GER	Maximilian Stahl
33	MF	BLR	Rodion Hushcha
37	GK	GER	Jan Mottl
38	MF	GER	Luka Kalandia
39	MF	GER	Altin Ibisi
40	MF	TUR	Berkay Öztürk (on loan from FC Ingolstadt 04)

=== Notable past players ===
- (Germany) Albin Kitzinger (MF)
- (Germany) Andreas Kupfer (MF)
- (Germany) Robert Bernard (MF)
- (Germany) Günter Bernard (GK)
- (Germany) Lothar Emmerich (FW)
- (Germany) Erwin Albert (FW)
- (Germany) Michael Glowatzky (FW)
- (Germany) Sebastian Kneißl (MF)
- (Germany) Florian Trinks (MF)
- (Germany) Daniel Adlung (MF)

=== International caps ===
Germany national football team (Caps/Goals):

- (Germany) Albin Kitzinger: 44/2
- (Germany) Andreas Kupfer: 44/1
- (Germany) Günter Bernard: 2/0 (3 additional caps for SV Werder Bremen)

Europe XI (Caps/Goals):

- (Germany) Albin Kitzinger: 1/0
- (Germany) Andreas Kupfer: 1/0

== Non-playing staff ==
=== Current management team ===
As of 20 February 2026

Name	Position	Source
Coaching staff
(Germany) Jan Gernlein	Head coach	
(Germany) Marcel Kühlinger	Assistant coach	
(Germany) Norbert Kleider	Goalkeeping coach	
Medical department
(Germany) Matthias Blanke	Team doctor	
(Germany) Simon Herwerth	Team doctor	

=== Managerial history ===
Head coaches of the club from 1929:

Manager	Start	Finish
(Germany) Karl Willnecker	1 July 1929	30 June 1930
(Germany) Hans Teufel	1 July 1930	30 June 1933
(Germany) Leonhard Seiderer	1 July 1933	30 June 1934
(Germany) Fritz Bennöder	1 July 1934	30 June 1935
(Germany) Hans Teufel	1 July 1935	30 April 1936
(Germany) Hans Sauerwein	1 May 1936	30 April 1938
(Germany) Ludwig Leinberger	1 May 1938	30 April 1941
(Germany) Albin Kitzinger	1 May 1941	30 April 1946
(Germany) Hans Teufel	1 May 1946	30 June 1947
(Germany) Andreas Kupfer	1 July 1947	30 March 1949
(Germany) Erich Kratzsch	1 April 1949	30 June 1950
(Germany) Albin Kitzinger	1 July 1950	30 June 1951
(Germany) Kuno Krügel	1 July 1951	31 October 1951
(Germany) Andreas Kupfer	1 November 1951	31 May 1953
(Germany) Fritz Teufel	1 June 1953	30 June 1959
(Germany) Fritz Käser	1 July 1959	30 June 1960
(Germany) Alfons Remlein	1 July 1960	31 December 1961
(Germany) Fritz Käser	1 January 1962	31 December 1963
(Germany) Andreas Kupfer	1 January 1964	30 June 1964
(Germany) Fritz Käser	1 July 1964	30 June 1965
(Germany) Gunther Baumann	1 July 1965	15 January 1967
(Germany) Bernd Oles	16 January 1967	30 Juny 1967
(Hungary) Jenő Vincze	1 July 1967	30 June 1971
(Germany) Kurt Koch	1 July 1971	15 November 1972
(Germany) WalterLang/Ludwig Merz	16 November 1972	31 December 1972
(Germany) Fritz Schollmeyer	1 January 1973	15 February 1974
(Germany) Walter Lang	16 February 1974	30 Juny 1974
(Hungary) István Sztani	1 July 1974	30 June 1975
(Germany) Peter Velhorn	1 July 1975	24 February 1976
(Germany) Gunther Baumann	25 February 1976	15 May 1976
(Hungary) István Sztani	16 May 1976	15 October 1976
(Germany) Fritz Käser	16 October 1976	15 October 1978
(Germany) Otto Baum	16 October 1978	30 Juny 1979
(Germany) Rolf Lamprecht	1 July 1979	30 June 1980
(Germany) Otto Baum	1 July 1980	15 March 1983
(Hungary) István Sztani	16 March 1983	30 June 1983
(Germany) Rudi Ziegler	1 July 1983	15 August 1984
(Germany) Edgar Kommer	16 August 1984	31 March 1985
(Germany) Heinz Wendrich	1 April 1985	15 December 1986
(Germany) Werner Lorant	16 December 1986	30 June 1990
(Germany) Elmar Wienecke	1 July 1990	12 August 1990
(Germany) Niko Semlitsch	13 August 1990	22 April 1991
(Germany) Georg Baier	23 April 1991	30 June 1991
(Germany) Franz Brungs	1 July 1991	17 November 1991
(Germany) Georg Baier	18 November 1991	30 June 1992
(Germany) Erwin Albert	1 July 1992	31 August 1993
(Germany) Riko Weigand	1 September 1993	15 February 1994
(Serbia) Đurađ Vasić	16 February 1994	14 September 2002
(Germany) Hans-Jürgen Boysen	18 September 2002	18 November 2003
(Germany) Rainer Hörgl	19 November 2003	30 June 2004
(Germany) Rainer Ulrich	1 July 2004	15 November 2004
(Germany) Rüdiger Mauder	16 November 2004	2 April 2006
(Germany) Bernd Häcker	3 April 2006	30 June 2006
(Germany) Wolfgang Hau	1 July 2006	16 January 2008
(Germany) Werner Dreßel	17 January 2008	30 June 2008
(Germany) Frank Lerch	1 July 2008	30 June 2009
(Germany) Klaus Scheer	1 July 2009	19 September 2011
(Germany) Udo Romeis	20 September 2011	30 June 2012
(Germany) Gerd Klaus	1 July 2012	30 June 2018
(Germany) Timo Wenzel	1 July 2018	5 November 2019
(Germany) Tobias Strobl	6 November 2019	1 April 2022
(Germany) Jan Gernlein	1 April 2022	31 May 2022
(Germany) Christian Gmünder	1 June 2022	27 February 2023
(Germany) Marc Reitmaier	27 February 2023	30 June 2024
(Germany) Victor Kleinhenz	1 July 2024	18 February 2026
(United States) Jermaine Jones	18 February 2026	30 June 2026
(Germany) Jan Gernlein	1 July 2026	

== Supporters and rivalries ==
The supporters of Schweinfurt 05 maintain a traditional friendship with the fans of FV 04 Würzburg. They have a distinct hostility with fans of FV 04 Würzburg‘s local rival FC Würzburger Kickers.

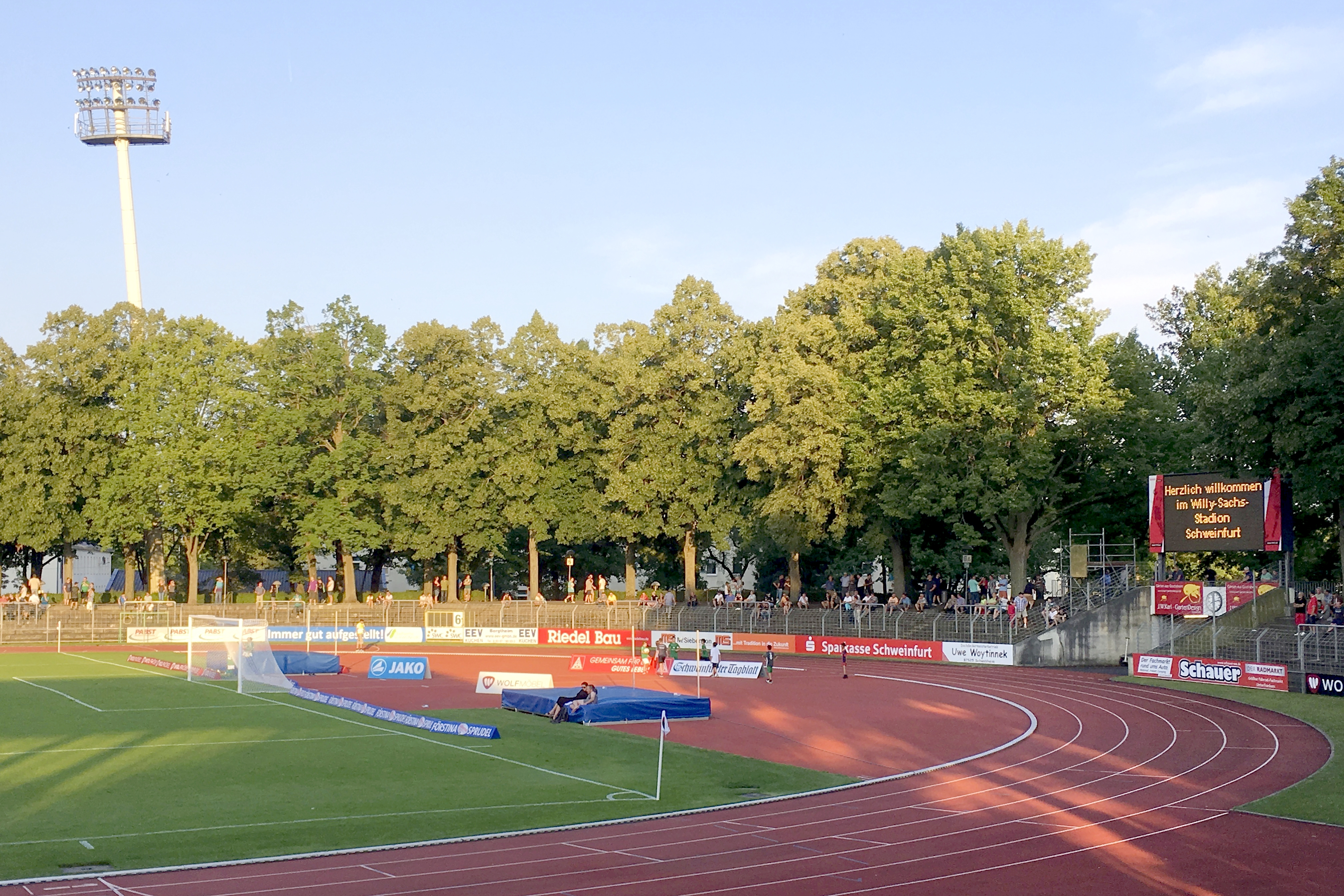
Fans prior to the start of a 2017–18 Regionalliga Bayern match

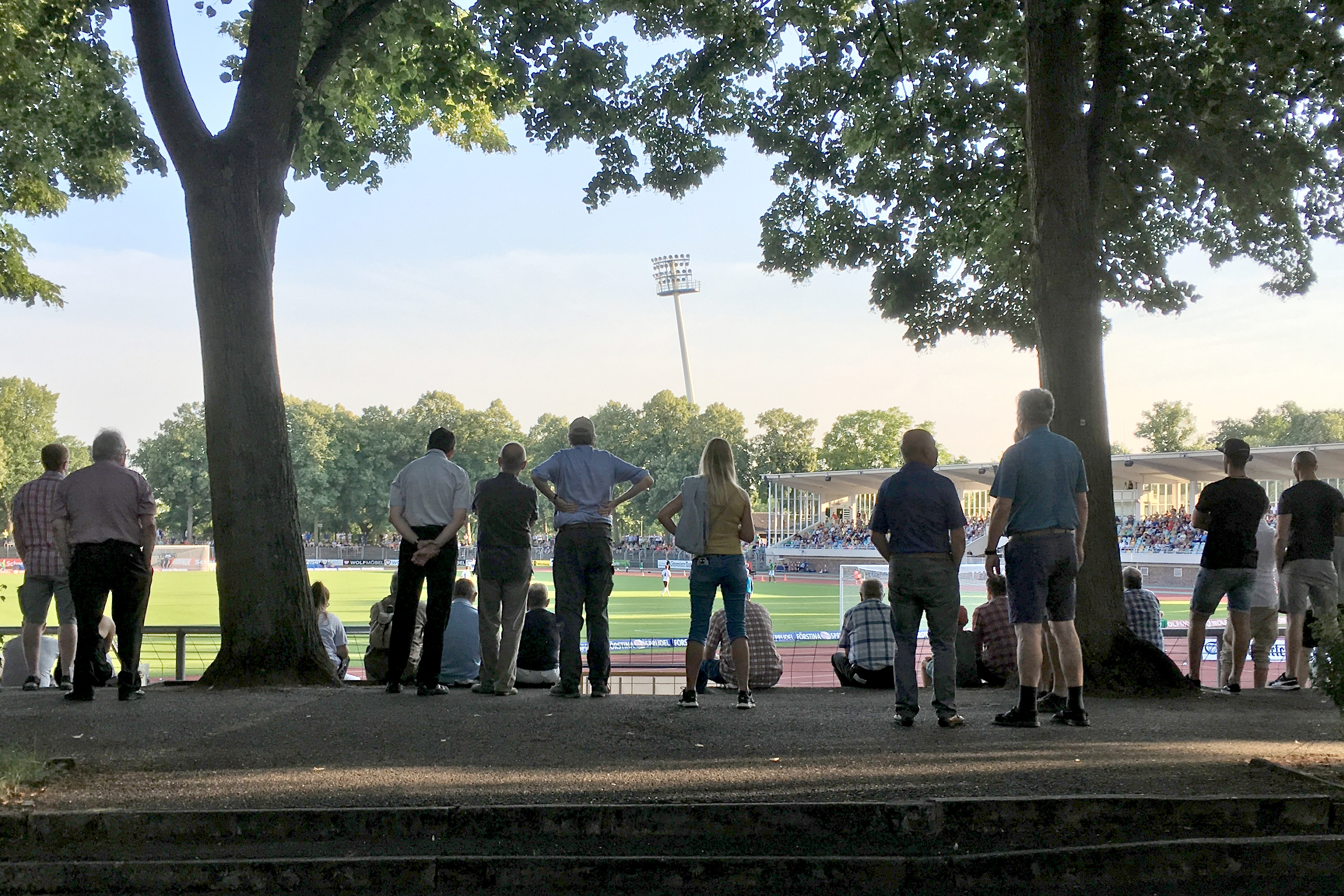
Spectators during a 2017–18 Regionalliga Bayern match

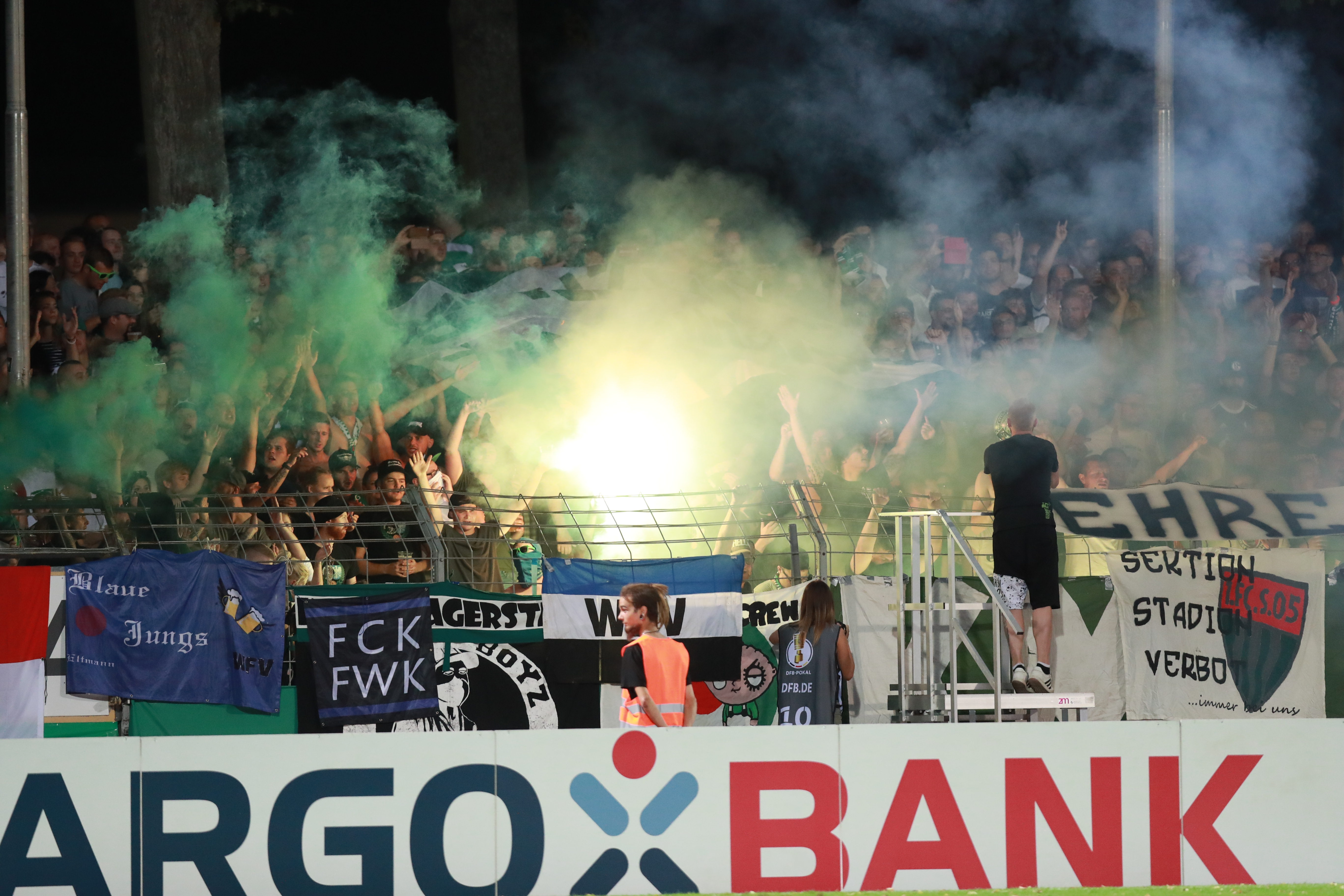
Support in the 2018–19 DFB-Pokal
