= 1944–45 Gauliga Bayern =

Gauliga Bayern
- Season: 1944–45
- Champions: not completed
- Relegated: not completed
- German championship: not held

The 1944–45 Gauliga Bayern was the twelfth and last season of the league, one of the regional divisions of the Gauligas in Germany at the time. It was the first tier of the football league system in Bavaria (German:Bayern) from 1933 to 1945. It was the final season of the league which operated in five regional divisions. None of the competitions were completed and some may not even have been started.

Of the five leagues the Gauliga München/Oberbayern progressed the furtherest with last recorded official Gauliga game being the Munich derby between FC Bayern and TSV 1860 on 23 April 1945, ending 3–2.

League football soon resumed in post-war Germany in mostly regional competitions. In the American occupation zone, in Southern Germany the tier one Oberliga Süd kicked off with the approval of the US occupation authorities on 4 November 1945, containing former Gauliga Bayern clubs 1. FC Nürnberg, Schwaben Augsburg, FC Bayern Munich, 1. FC Schweinfurt 05, BC Augsburg, TSV 1860 München and SpVgg Fürth.

== Tables ==
=== München/Oberbayern ===
The 1944–45 season saw the München/Oberbayern (English: Munich/Upper Bavaria) division made up from five clubs from the 1943–44 Gauliga Südbayern and five promoted clubs.

Pos	Team	Pld	W	D	L	GF	GA	GD	Pts
1	FC Bayern Munich	15	14	1	0	75	15	+60	29
2	TSV 1860 München	14	8	2	4	47	27	+20	18
3	SC Bajuwaren München	14	6	4	4	17	27	−10	16
4	FC Wacker München	14	6	1	7	41	31	+10	13
5	SpVgg Sendling	15	5	3	7	20	31	−11	13
6	FC Hertha München	14	4	3	7	26	44	−18	11
7	FC Alte Haide München	14	3	3	8	29	41	−12	9
8	VfB München	14	3	1	10	19	59	−40	7
9	KSG MTV/VfB Ingolstadt	6	2	0	4	17	16	+1	4
10	LSV Fürstenfeldbruck (Note: LSV Fürstenfeldbruck withdrawn)	0	0	0	0	0	0	0	0

Source: claudionicoletti.eu
Rules for classification: 1) Points

=== Schwaben ===
The 1944–45 season saw the Schwaben (English: Swabia) division made up from four clubs from the 1943–44 Gauliga Südbayern and three promoted clubs.

Pos	Team	Pld	W	D	L	GF	GA	GD	Pts
1	Schwaben Augsburg	10	6	0	4	27	22	+5	12
2	KSG BC/Post Augsburg	8	4	3	1	27	16	+11	11
3	LSV Kaufbeuren	6	4	0	2	25	8	+17	8
4	TV Landsberg	7	3	2	2	19	18	+1	8
5	VfL Günzburg	7	3	0	4	13	18	−5	6
6	Reichsbahn SG Pfersee	6	2	1	3	10	13	−3	5
7	TSG Augsburg	6	0	0	6	5	31	−26	0

Source: claudionicoletti.eu
Rules for classification: 1) Points

=== Mittelfranken ===
The 1944–45 season saw the Mittelfranken (English: Middle Franconia) division made up from four clubs from the 1943–44 Gauliga Nordbayern and five promoted clubs.

Pos	Team	Pld	W	D	L	GF	GA	GD	Pts
1	SpVgg Fürth	9	7	1	1	35	15	+20	15
2	1. FC Nürnberg	8	6	0	2	35	11	+24	12
3	SG Nürnberg	6	3	1	2	35	14	+21	7
4	KSG Wacker/Pfeil/Viktoria Nürnberg	6	2	1	3	18	34	−16	5
5	KSG FC/TV Zirndorf	4	2	0	2	14	8	+6	4
6	FC Eintracht Franken Nürnberg	6	1	2	3	11	23	−12	4
7	KSG Post/Reichsbahn Nürnberg-Fürth	8	1	1	6	12	36	−24	3
8	VfL Nürnberg	5	1	0	4	8	27	−19	2
9	FC Stein (Note: FC Stein withdrawn)	0	0	0	0	0	0	0	0

Source: claudionicoletti.eu
Rules for classification: 1) Points

=== Oberfranken ===
The 1944–45 season saw the Oberfranken (English: Upper Franconia) division made up from two clubs from the 1943–44 Gauliga Nordbayern and four promoted clubs. It is unknown whether any of the seasons games were played but the following clubs were grouped in the division:

- 1. FC Bamberg
- Reichsbahn SG Weiden
- VfB Coburg
- FC Michelau
- KSG Bayreuth
- FC Bayern Hof

=== Oberpfalz/Niederbayern ===
The 1944–45 season saw the Oberpfalz/Niederbayern (English: Upper Palatinate/Lower Bavaria) division made up from two clubs from the 1943–44 Gauliga Südbayern and six promoted clubs. It is unknown whether any of the seasons games were played but the following clubs were grouped in the division:

- SSV Jahn Regensburg
- 1. FC Straubing
- LSV Straubing
- Reichsbahn SG Regensburg
- SpVgg Walhalla Regensburg
- Turnerschaft Regensburg
- Reichsbahn SG Schwandorf
- SpVgg Landshut
