= Köngen =

- Municipality
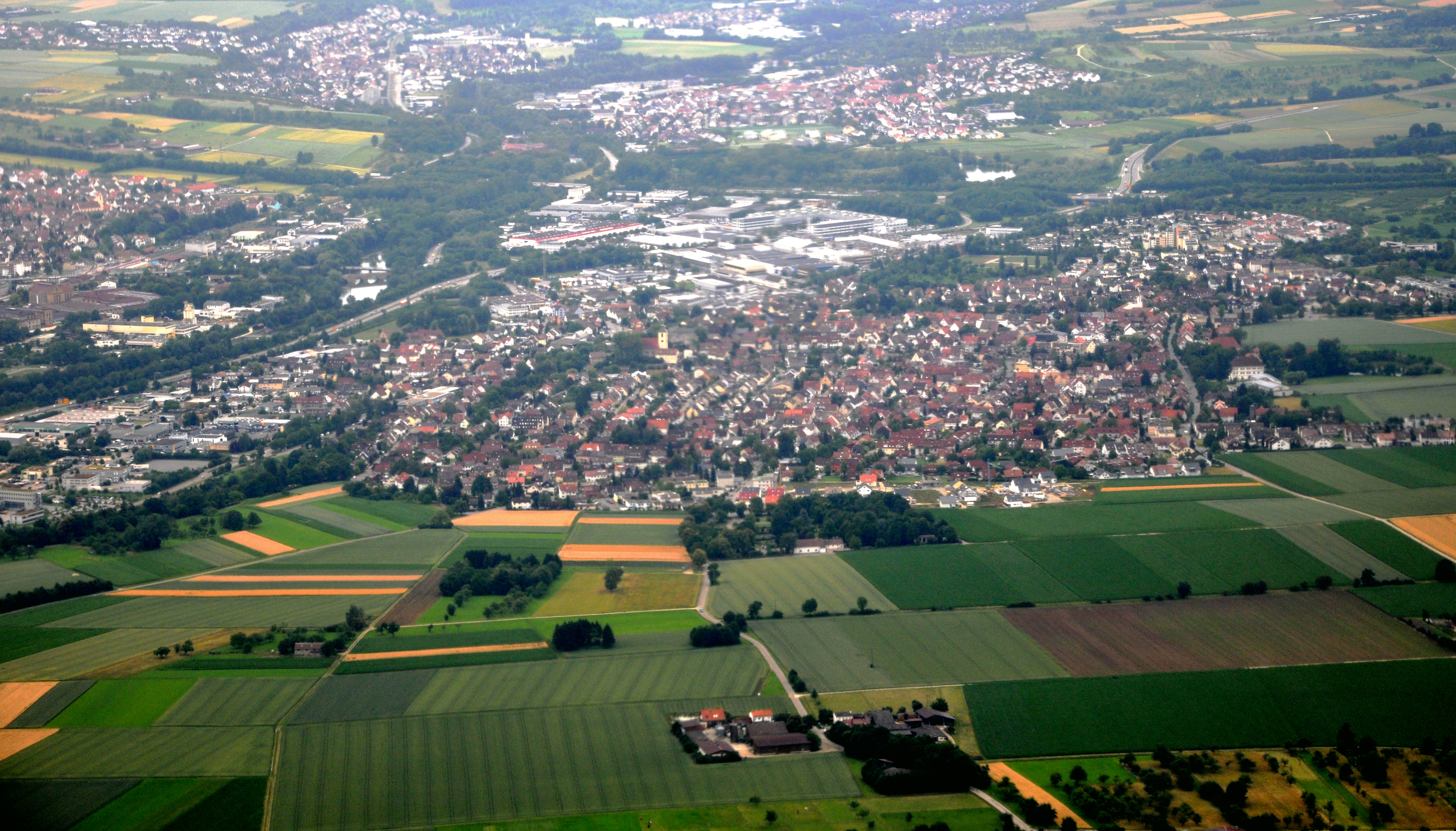
- Aerial view

- Coat of arms

- Location of Köngen within Esslingen district
- Interactive map of Köngen
- Location within Germany Location within Baden-Württemberg
- Coordinates: 48°40′55″N 9°22′0″E
- Country: Germany
- State: Baden-Württemberg
- Admin. region: Stuttgart
- District: Esslingen

Government
  - Mayor (2024–32): Ronald Scholz

Area
  - Total: 12.52 km^{2} (4.83 sq mi)
- Elevation: 281 m (922 ft)

Population (2025-12-31)
  - Total: 9,656
  - Density: 771.2/km^{2} (1,998/sq mi)
- Time zone: UTC+01:00 (CET)
  - Summer (DST): UTC+02:00 (CEST)
- Postal codes: 73257
- Dialling codes: 07024
- Vehicle registration: ES
- Website: www.koengen.de

Köngen (German pronunciation: [ˈkœŋən]) is a municipality in the district of Esslingen in Baden-Württemberg in Germany. About nine kilometers from the district city Esslingen am Neckar and about six kilometers away from Nürtingen. It is part of the Stuttgart Region and the European Stuttgart Metropolitan Region.

== Geography ==
=== Geographical location ===
Köngen is located on the left side of the river Neckar on the western slopes of the Neckar valley.

=== Neighboring communities ===
Adjacent communities are in northern Deizisau, northeast Wernau, southeast Wendlingen, south Unterensingen and west Denkendorf (all Esslingen district).

=== Municipality arrangement ===
The municipality includes the village Köngen, the yards Birkenhöfe, Buchenhöfe, Erlenhöfe, Kempflerhöfe, Lerchenhof, Riedhöfe, Rothöfe, Seehof, Talhof and Wangerhöfe and the house Altenberg.

=== Area distribution by type ===
According to data from the Statistical State office, effective 2014.

== History ==
=== Ancient history ===
Köngen is in the area of the Roman settlement Grinario that was built around 100 AD around a Roman castra. Grinario was the endpoint of the Roman road "Neckar-Alb-Aare" which originated in Windisch (Switzerland). In 260 the place was destroyed by the Alemanni and the Romans were expelled.

=== Middle Ages ===
The Alemanni place was first mentioned in 1075 in a document of the Hirsau Abbey. In 1336 the lords of Hohenberg sold the village to Albrecht von Aichelberg. In 1382 the lords of Thumb von Neuburg attained the sovereignty, who relocated their residence from Grisons to Köngen in 1430. Hans Friedrich Thumb promoted early the Reformation; already in 1527 was therefore preached Lutheran in Köngen, this is seven years before Duke Ulrich penetrated in 1534 the Reformation in Württemberg.

=== Modern history ===
Around the year 1600 about 900 people inhabited the village. During the 17th century Köngen suffered from several outbreaks of diseases and war violence. From 1609 until 1611 there was a first plague outbreak, the second one happened in 1627. About one third of the population died from the disease. Over one hundred inhabitants were killed by marauding troops of the victorious emperorer after the Battle of Nördlingen in 1634. The number of 1,000 inhabitants was only passed during the first half of the 18th century. 1739 Köngen became part of Württemberg, at this time the former owners (Thumb von Neuburg) had already been in Württemberg service for more than 200 years. After the foundation of the Kingdom of Württemberg in 1806 until 1808 Köngen was seat of an Oberamt. During the consolidation phase of the new württembergian administration it was allocated to the Oberamt Esslingen, which was as part of the Kreisreform (county reform) during the National Socialist time in 1938 changed and enlarged to the district of Esslingen. Because Köngen became part of the American occupation zone after the Second World War, it belonged to the state of Württemberg-Baden, founded in 1945 which in 1952 merged into today's state of Baden-Württemberg.

=== Religion ===
Since the Reformation Köngen has been mostly Lutheran. Only since 1953 there has been a catholic church again. The new building became necessary because of the relocation of many catholic Heimatvertriebene ("homeland expellees"). Furthermore, there are a United Methodist Church and since 1924 a New Apostolic Church.

=== Population ===
The populations are estimates, results of the censuses in Germany (¹) or official updates of the statistical state office (only main residence).

| Date | Population |
|---|---|
| 1600 | 900 |
| 1740 | 1.010 |
| 1800 | 1.400 |
| 1 December 1871 ¹ | 2.088 |
| 1 December 1900 ¹ | 2.288 |
| 17 May 1939 ¹ | 3.036 |
| 13 September 1950 ¹ | 4.160 |
| 6 June 1961 ¹ | 5.923 |
| 27 May 1970 ¹ | 8.113 |
| 25 May 1987 ¹ | 8.058 |
| 31 December 1995 | 8.818 |
| 31 December 2000 | 9.408 |
| 31 December 2005 | 9.681 |
| 31 December 2010 | 9.613 |
| 31 December 2015 | 9.718 |
| 30 December 2017 | 10.021 |

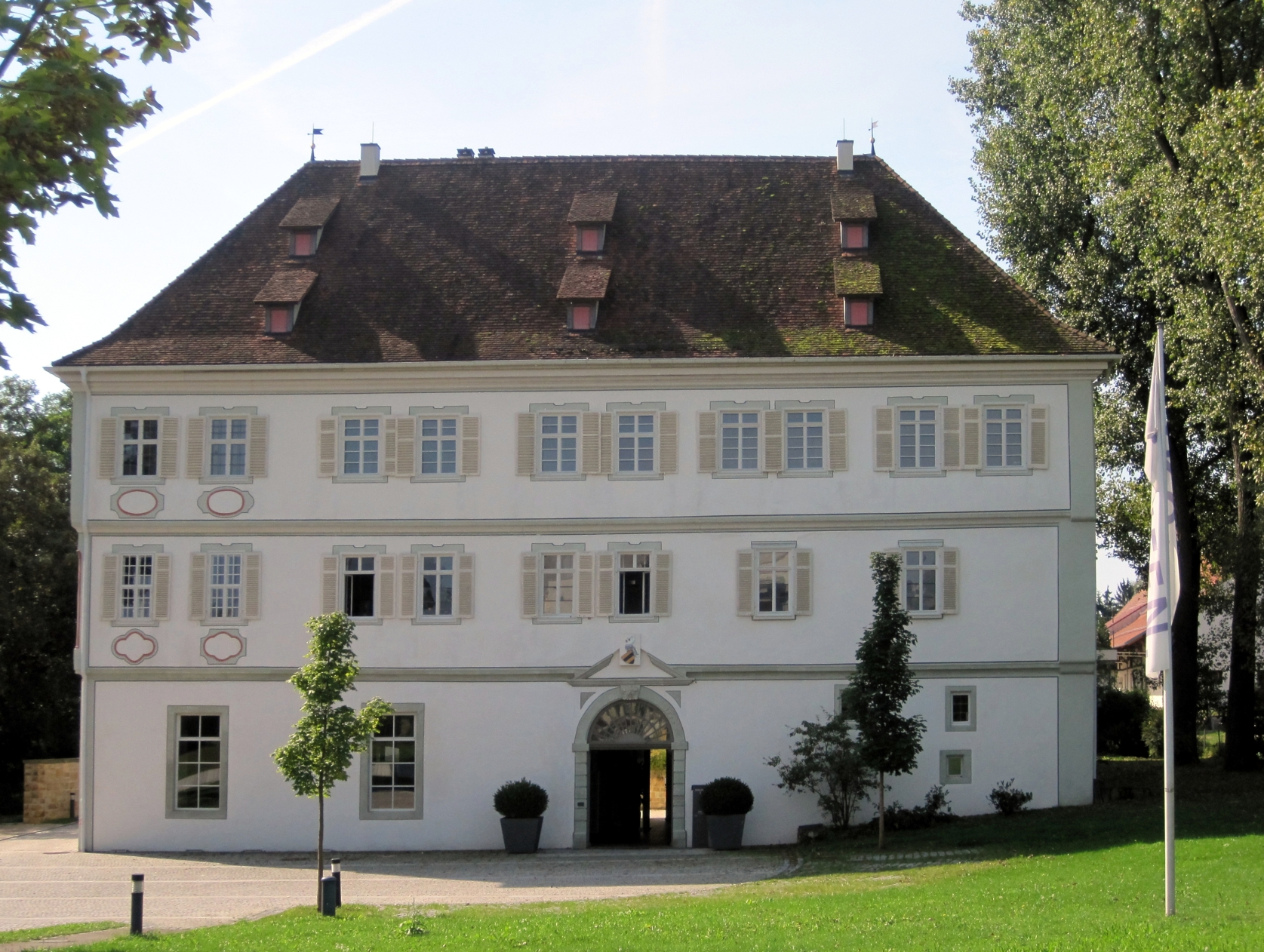
Köngen Palace

== Politics ==
=== Mayors ===
- 1945–1946 Wilhelm Zaiser
- 1947 Gustav Bracher
- 1947–1982 Erwin Rath
- 1982–2014 Hans Weil
- 2014–2024 Otto Ruppaner
- since 2024 Ronald Scholz

=== Municipal Council ===
The municipal council in Köngen has 18 members. The local election on 26 May 2019 had the following official results. The municipal council consists of the elected honorary members of the council and the mayor as chairperson. The mayor is eligible to vote.

| Parties and Voting Blocks | | %2019 | Seats2019 | %2014 | Seats2014 |
| FW | Freie Wähler | 41,46 | 7 | 39,87 | 7 |
| CDU | Christlich Demokratische Union Deutschlands | 27,21 | 5 | 29,65 | 5 |
| SPD | Sozialdemokratische Partei Deutschlands | 16,52 | 3 | -- | -- |
| GRÜNE | Bündnis 90/Die Grünen | 14,81 | 3 | -- | -- |
| SPD/GRÜNE | Sozialdemokratische Partei Deutschlands–Bündnis 90/Die Grünen | -- | -- | 30,48 | 6 |
| Total | | 100,0 | 18 | 100,0 | 18 |
| Voter turnout | | 65,70 % | | 53,3 % | |

=== Heraldry ===
Blazon: "In blue a silver bell".

Köngen has the largest bell of its Peter-und-Paulskirche in its coat of arms. This bell is supposed to have been buried during the Thirty Years' War for fear of marauders. When the war was over no one was alive anymore who knew the hiding place. The lost bell was then uncovered from the ground, according to legend, by pigs. Since then the bell is named Sauglocke ("sow bell").

=== Sister cities ===
Köngen maintains partnerships to:

- Taucha in Saxony-Anhalt and
- Český Brod in the Czech Republic.

== Economy and infrastructure ==
=== Transportation ===
Köngen is connected to the national road network through the federal road B 313 and the Bundesautobahn 8. The bus line 151 connects the town to the nearby train station of Wendlingen am Neckar. From there trains run towards Tübingen and Stuttgart, the S-Bahn runs towards Stuttgart and Kirchheim unter Teck.

Since 2016 an additional citizens' bus runs in Köngen on 3 weekdays and since December 2016 the new Express bus X10 creates a direct connection to Stuttgart Airport and the train station Kirchheim unter Teck.

=== Established businesses ===
DHL operates in Köngen a parcel center with 700 employees. Also, mechanical engineering companies and plastic processing companies are located in Köngen.

== Education ==
In Köngen there are a primary and secondary school (the Burgschule), and a further primary school, the Mörikeschule, named after Eduard Mörike. In addition, there are seven kindergartens in Köngen. The library of the municipality Köngen is located the attic of the tithe barn and has a stock of around 15,000 media.

== Culture and points of interest ==
=== Points of interest ===
- Köngen is located at the Neckar line of the Upper Germanic-Rhaetian Limes. In the town the 23 km (14 mi) long Lautertal Limes line splits off from the Neckar line, which ends at the Alb Limes at Donnstetten (a parish of Römerstein). This straight path had already been known as Sibyllenspur for a long time prior to its interpretation as Limes in 1976.
- Köngen is start and end point of the scenic route Römerstraße Neckar–Alb–Aare.
- Notable are two replicas of Jupiter Columns:
  - Replica of the Jupiter Column of Hausen an der Zaber on top of the roundabout at the Plochinger Straße.
  - Replica of the Jupiter Column of Walheim in front of the reconstructed guard tower in the southeast corner of the roman park.
- Roman Museum and Archaeological Park Köngen. The Castra of Köngen has been a Kulturdenkmal (cultural monument) since 1974 and is the only castra along the entire Neckarlimes not being over built after the war. It is as a military camp at the roman Limes part of the UNESCO World Heritage since 2005. The corner tower of the old garrison was found in 1885 by general Eduard von Kallee and already reconstructed in 1911.
- The Köngen Palace was first constructed in 1392 as a castle by the local lord, the Free Imperial Knight Hans Thumb von Neuburg. The Neuburg still exists today as a ruin north of Chur in Grisons. Already in 1398 the castle was expanded to a water castle with four wings. In 1520 the castle was heavily damaged by troops of the Swabian League. Therefore, an almost entirely new construction was built after 1520. The castle changed into a Renaissance palace. During this construction the great hall was expanded in 1538, which has survived almost unchanged up to today. The changes took almost the entire 16th century. Heinrich Schickhardt mentioned in his catalogue that he had built a gate house at the palace around 1600. It was torn down together with two wings during the changes made by Jakob Friedrich Weishaar. Weishaar bought the estate in 1825 and let it be changed according to his needs. Up to the 1930s it was a place for culture. Here the youth association "Bund der Köngener" was established. The painter Christian Mali and the Dutch-German painters family Peters stayed often in the palace. During the last few years, frescos from the 18th century on the eastern wall of the great hall have been uncovered and restored. They show figures out of antique mythology and history.
- The foundation stone for the protestantist church Peter- und Pauls-Kirche was laid in 1502 by the builder Stefan Waid. After his death in 1504 it was finished by builder Merx from Esslingen until 1512. The dimensions of the nave are 23.0 m (75.5 ft) times 12.1 m (40 ft). Unter a king post a painted renaissance beam ceiling is hanging since 1613. The western tower was constructed in 1724. The originally late Gothic carved altar was remodeled in 1614. The architects Kreuz + Kreuz from Stuttgart conducted the latest internal renovations in 2011. Features: The sculptor Martin Scheible from Ulm created a pulpit with carved reliefs in 1953 (topics: the works of mercy); the renaissance pulpit ceiling remained. The glas artist Wolf-Dieter Kohler from Stuttgart designed the glas paintings of the three choir windows in 1958 (left: three parables; middle: returning Christ, Angel, Michael; right: three further parables).
- The cultural heritage listed Ulrichsbrücke, a bridge over the Neckar river, was constructed according to plans by Heinrich Schickhardt between 1600 and 1602. It is located at the place of an earlier roman bridge. Due to impoundment downstream the pillars of the bridge are nowadays partially under the water level.
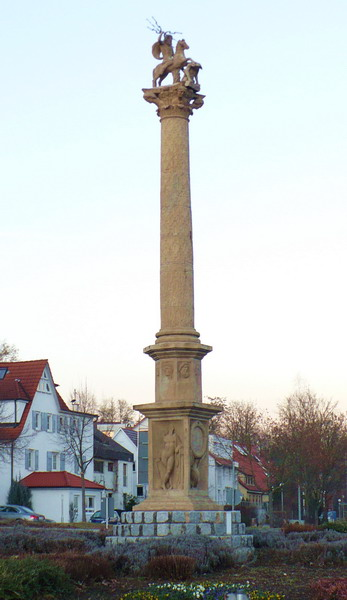
Replica of the Jupiter Column of Hausen an der Zaber in Köngen

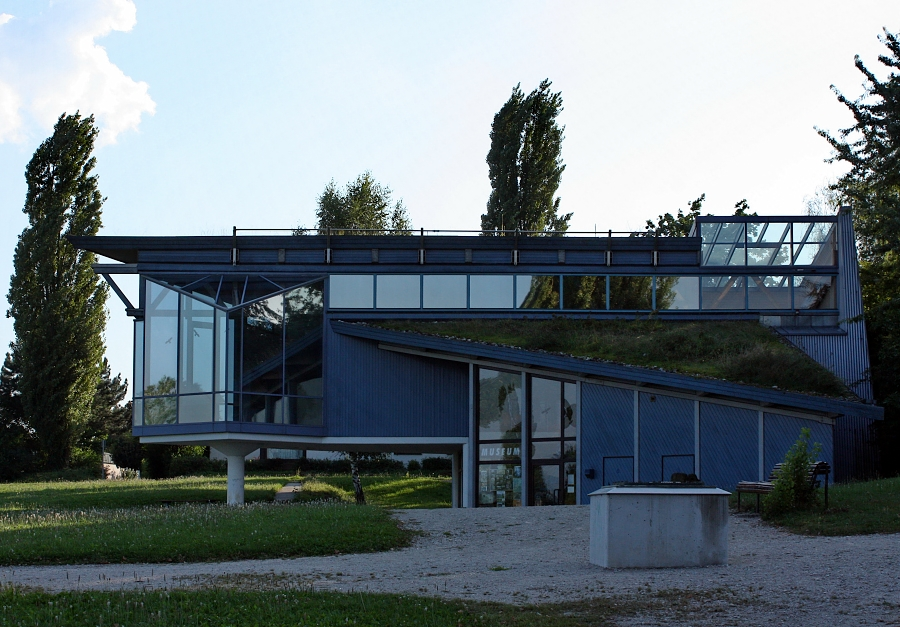
Roman Museum Köngen

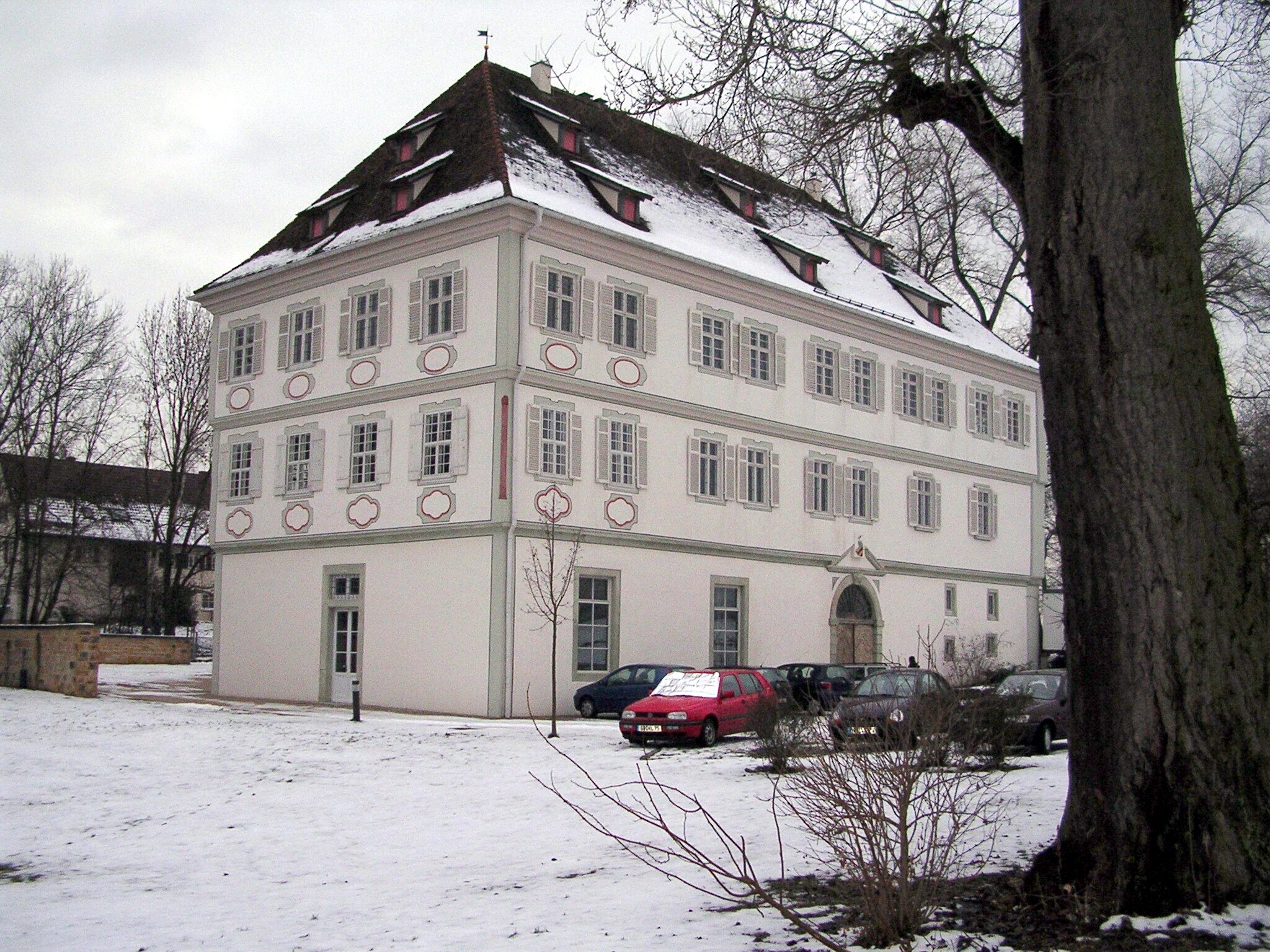
Köngen Palace

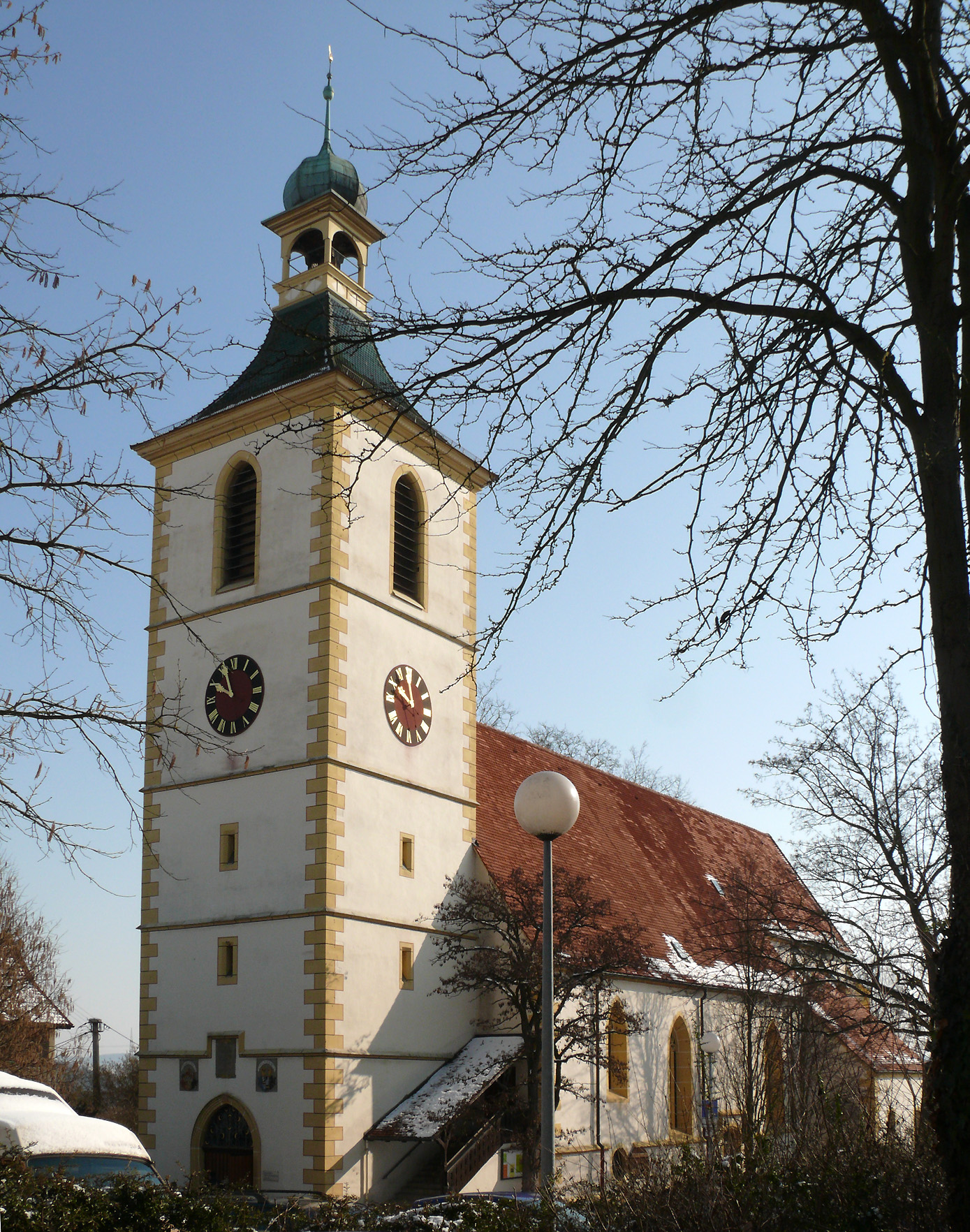
Protestant Peter- and Pauls-Church

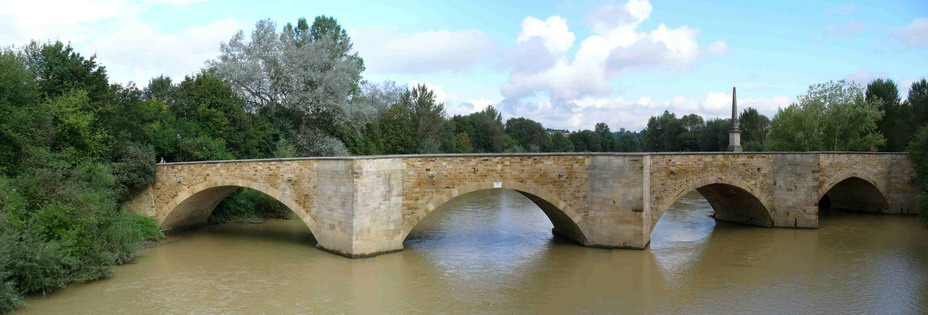
The Ulrichsbrücke, a bridge over the Neckar built in 1602

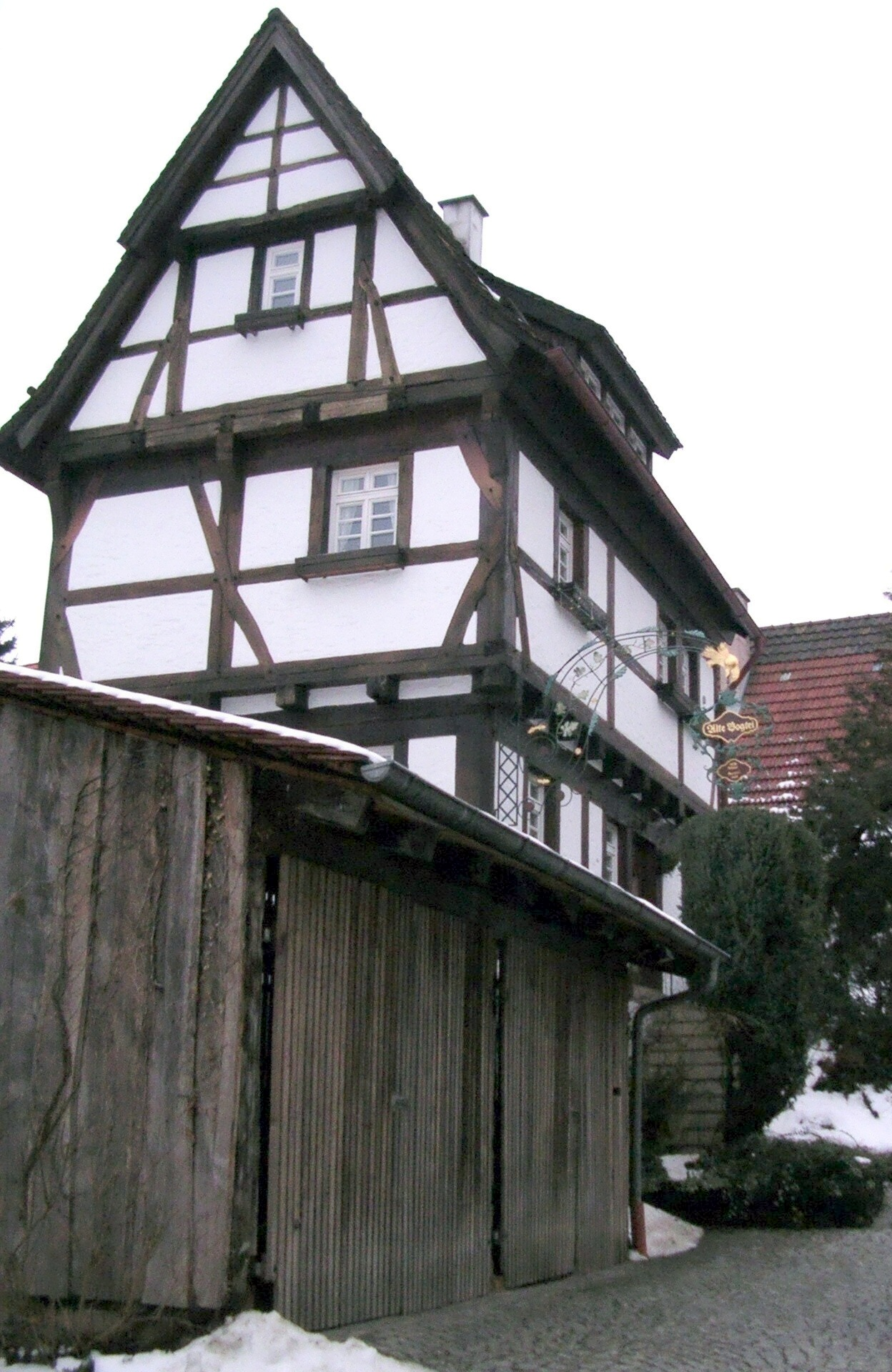
Alte Vogtei

=== Regular events ===
- Pfingstmarkt (Pentecost market on Pentecost Monday)
- Autumn market
- Culture days
- weekly market
- Pentecost music festival of the Musikverein Köngen e. V.
- 3k-Festival

== Notable people ==
=== Sons and daughters of the city ===
- Konrad Thumb von Neuburg (1465-1525), hereditary marshal of Ulrich, duke of Württemberg
- Gustav Adolf Boley (1835-1891), entrepreneur and inventor
- Nicolai Theilinger (* 1992), handball player

=== Other personalities who are associated with Köngen ===
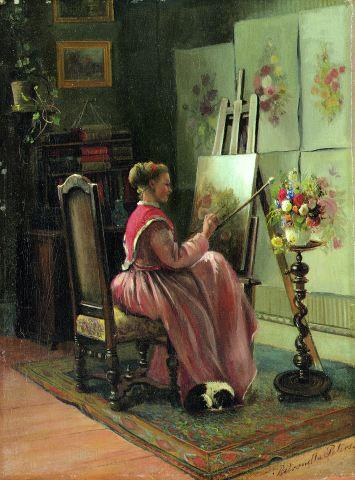
Pietrosella Peters around 1870

- Daniel Pfisterer (1651–1728), documented the live in Köngen both in its positive and negative aspects in many pictures and rimes
- Jakob Friedrich Weishaar (1775-1834), Württemberg politician, president of the Chamber of Deputies, lived from 1823 until his death in Köngen
- Eduard Mörike (1804-1875), was from May until December 1827 vicar with pastor Nathaniel Gottlieb Renz
- Eduard von Kallee (1818–1888), discovered the military camp of the castra Köngen in 1885 due to military considerations
- Christian Mali (1832–1906), Animal, Landscape and Genre painter, during his life - especially in his last years - the artist spend much time at the Köngener Schloss
- Anna Peters (1843-1926), painter, lived and worked from 1894 to 1924 again at Schloss Köngen
- Pietrosella Peters (1848-1924), painter, lived and worked from 1894 to 1924 again at Schloss Köngen
- Otto Rennefeld (1887–1957), poet and anthropologist, from 1946 in Köngen
- Ilse Rennefeld (1895–1984), anthropologist doctor, from 1946 in Köngen
- Else Klink (1907-1994), from 1935 to 1991 Head of Eurythmeum Stuttgart, lived in Köngen
