= Braith =

Braith is a surname. Notable people with the surname include:

- Anton Braith (1836–1905), German painter
- George Braith (born 1939), American saxophonist

== See also ==
- Braith Anasta (born 1982), Greek-Australian rugby league player
