= Johann Baptist Pflug =

German painter

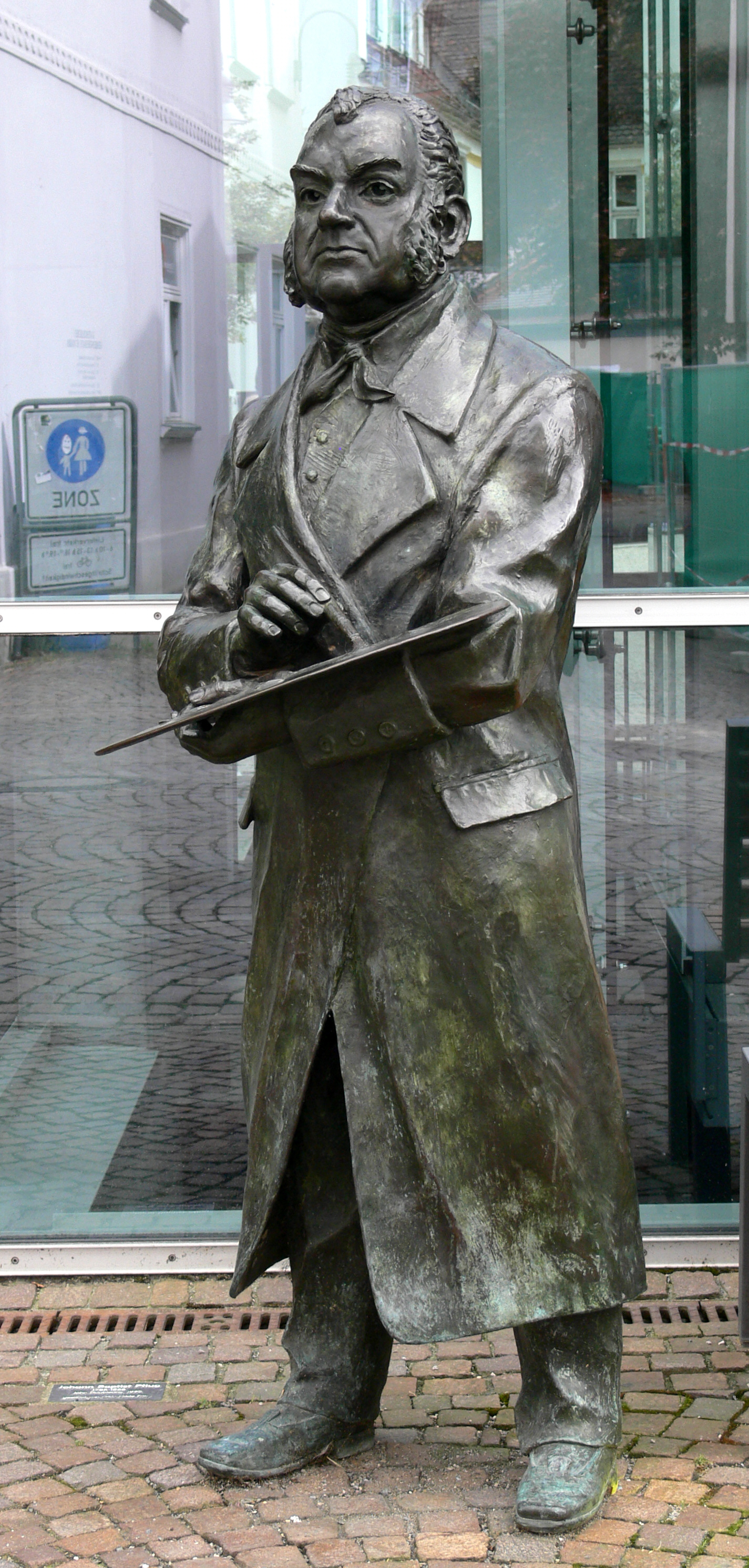
Statue of Johann Baptist Pflug in Biberach by John Doubleday

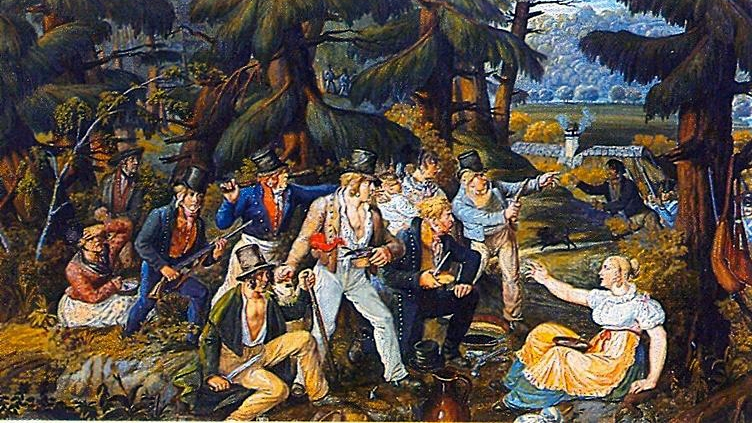
Capturing the Robbers (1822)

Johann Baptist Pflug (13 February 1785 – 30 May 1866) was a German genre painter.

== Life ==
He was born in Biberach an der Riss. At the age of twelve, after attending the local elementary school, he became a choirboy at the local monastery where he continued his education and received his first drawing lessons. When the monastery closed, the fathers recommended that he become a church painter. Johann Franz Schefold (1750–1828), a lawyer whose father was a church painter, acted as a sort of patron to Pflug, allowing him access to his library and gallery. In 1806, he went to the Academy of Fine Arts Munich where he studied under Johann Christian von Mannlich, whose instruction consisted largely of having him make copies of the Dutch Masters. At the outbreak of the Tyrolean Rebellion, he returned to Biberach where he passed an art examination and became a teacher at the newly created Biberach Gymnasium, a post he held until 1856.

Beginning in 1813, his painting focused largely on genre scenes and costume pictures of soldiers or robbers. From 1825 to 1830, he published a series of colored engravings entitled "Rural doings in Württemberg" (Ländliche Gebräuche in Württemberg), which established his popularity throughout Germany. As a teacher, he discovered and promoted many young artists who would come to be called "The Biberach School". These included Eberhard Emminger and Anton Braith.

Pflug died in 1866 in Biberach an der Riss. His memoirs (published in 1874) and works offer a representation of daily life in nineteenth-century Germany.

== Selected works ==
- Lagerszene bei Bergerhausen oberhalb Biberbach: Österreichische Kavallerie und Infanterie, ein Geschütz im Mittelgrund, im Hintergrund Zelte und Train, Oktober 1815 (Camp Scene at Bergerhausen), 1826, Heeresgeschichtliches Museum, Vienna
- Die Waldburg mit Blick auf den Bodensee (Waldburg Overlooking the Bodensee), c.1836, Braith-Mali Museum, Biberach an der Riss
- Die Gefangennahme der Räuber (Rosenbergerbande) (Capturing the Robbers), 1822, gouache, private collection

== Writings ==
- Aus der Räuber- und Franzosenzeit Schwabens. Die Erinnerungen des schwäbischen Malers aus den Jahren 1780-1840. (Memoirs) Reissued by Max Zengerle. Weißenhorn: Anton H. Konrad Verlag, 1974, ISBN 3-87437-113-1
