= Pietronella Peters =

German painter

- Born: 4 March 1848; Stuttgart
- Died: 1924 (aged 75–76); Stuttgart
- Occupation: Painter

Pietronella Peters (1848–1924) was a German painter who specialized in portraits and genre scenes of children.

== Biography ==
She was born to Pieter Francis Peters, a Dutch landscape painter, and his wife, Heinrike Gertrude née Mali. Her grandfather was a glass painter in Nijmegen and her uncle, Christian Mali, was a well-known animal painter of the Munich School, who lived with her family. Her sister, Anna Peters, became a still-life painter, specializing in flowers. She received her first lessons from her father and uncles, Christian and Johannes Cornelis.

In addition to her portraits of children, she painted numerous portraits of her extended family members. Peters contributed illustrations to Isabella Braun's Der Mädchen liebstes Buch (1880) as well as publishing a series of portraits: Girls Album. From 1894 to 1904, and then again from 1907 until her death, she spent summers at Schloss Köngen, a 13th-century castle in Esslingen, where she created scenes featuring the children of the castle's inhabitants.

From 1912 until 1924, she lived with her sisters Anna and Ida. A large collection of her works may be found at the Braith-Mali-Museum in Biberach an der Riß and at Schloss Köngen.

== Selected paintings ==
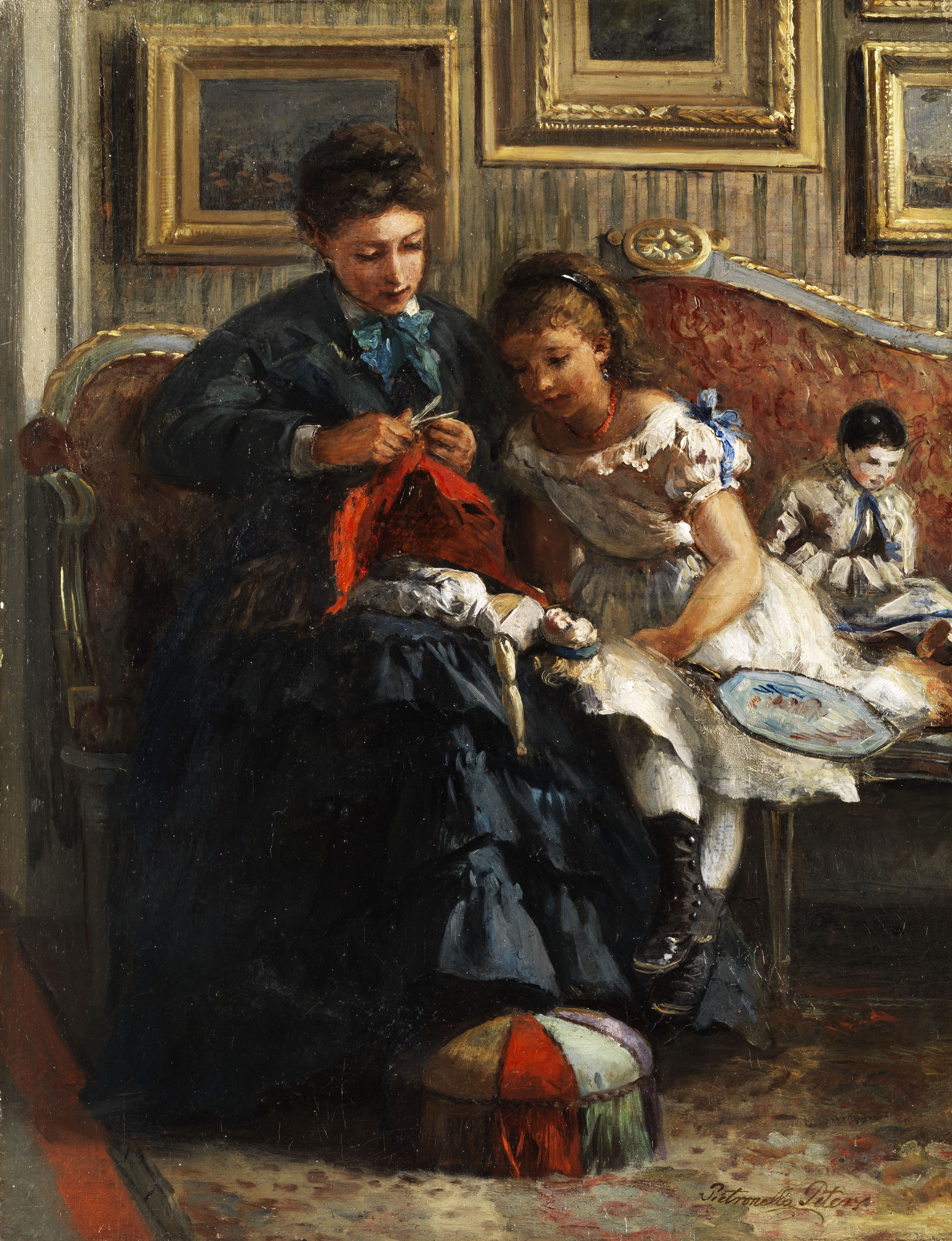
The Puppet's New Dress

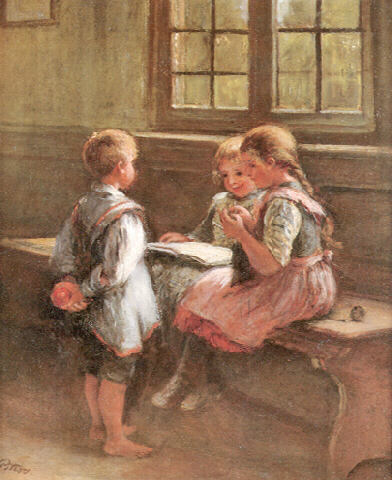
Tea Talk

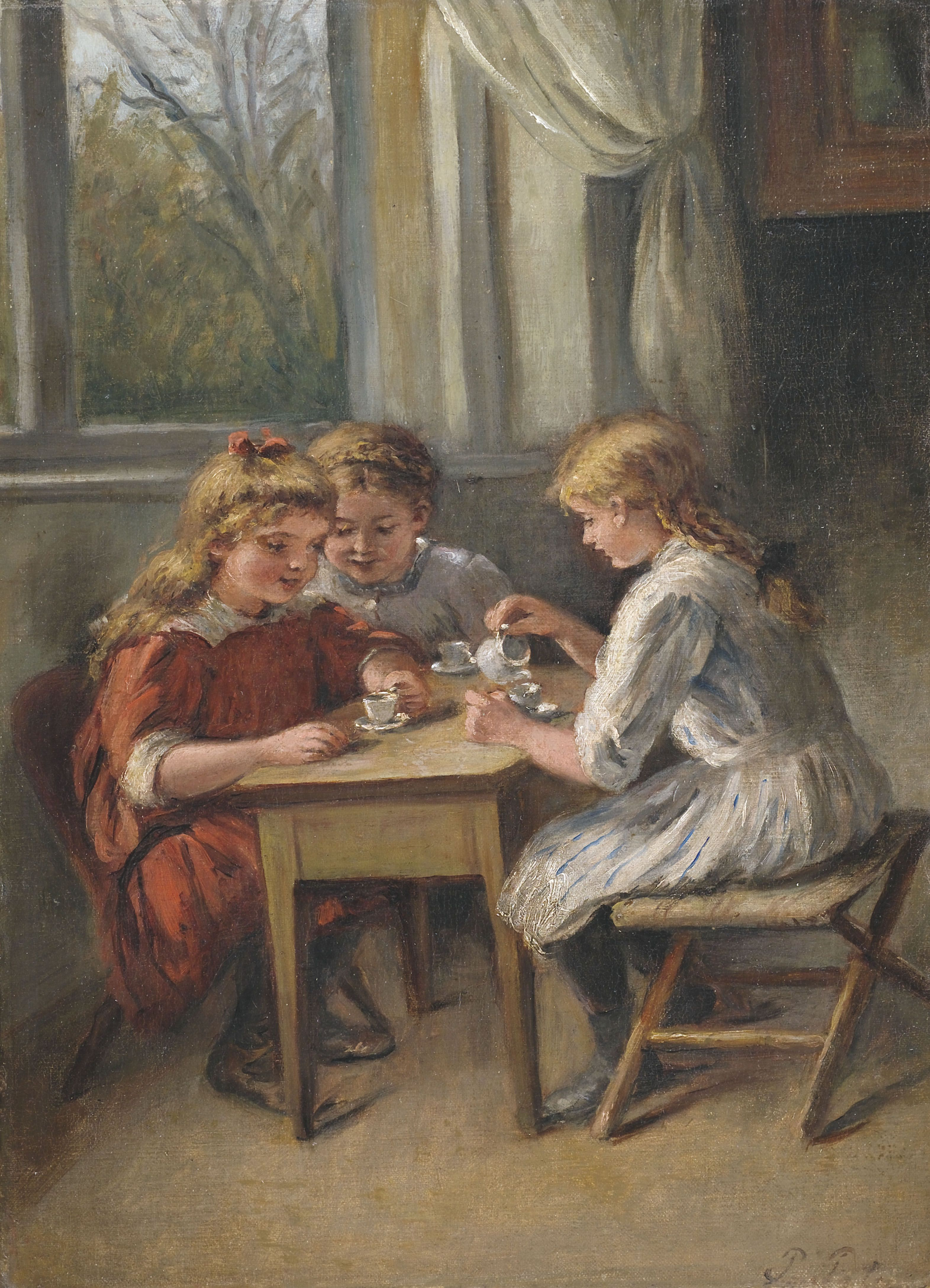
Children's Tea

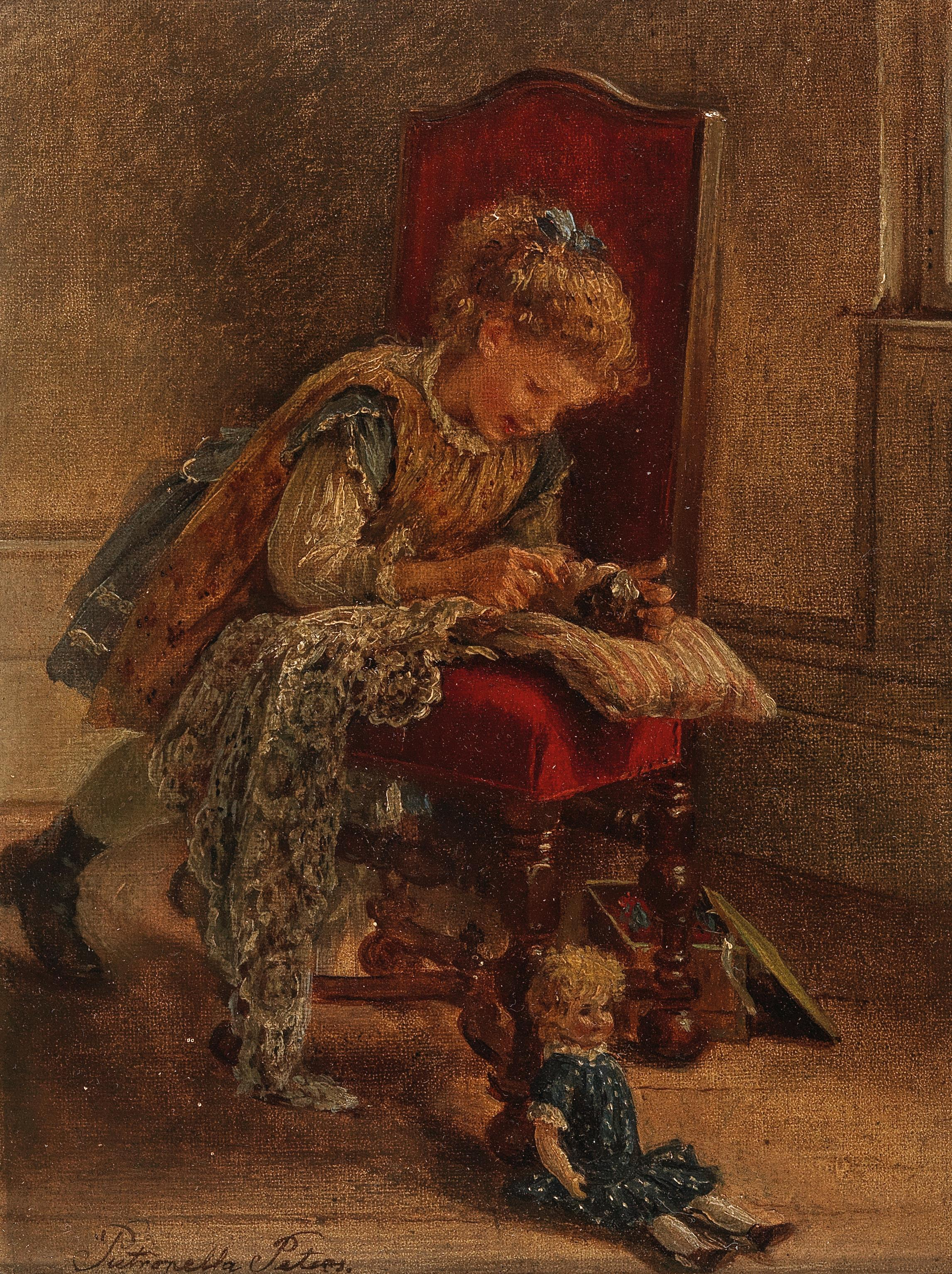
Darling

== Sources ==
- Monika Machnicki: Anna Peters. Vorwort zum Katalog zur Ausstellung "Anna Peters 1843 - 1926" im Braith-Mali-Museum in Biberach an der Riß, 1990, ISBN 3-924392-13-7
- Herbert Hoffmann, Kurt Diemer: Katalog der Gemälde und Skulpturen, Braith-Mali-Museum, Biberach an der Riß, 1975
- (in German) Pietronella Peters. In: Ulrich Thieme, Felix Becker (editors): Allgemeines Lexikon der Bildenden Künstler von der Antike bis zur Gegenwart. Band XXVI, E. A. Seemann, Leipzig 1932, S. 481.
