= Pieter Francis Peters =

German painter

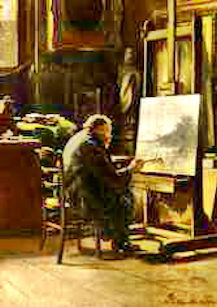
Peters at work, by his daughter, Pietronella

Pieter Francis Peters, originally Pieter Franciscus Peters Jr. (7 June 1818, Nijmegen - 23 February 1903, Stuttgart) was a Dutch-born German landscape painter, graphic artist and art dealer.

== Biography ==
His father was a well-known glass painter who gave him his only known art lessons. In 1841, he moved to Germany and, a year later, married Heinrike Gertrude Mali of Böblingen (died 1884), who came from a prominent family of Dutch-born painters. At first, they lived in Mannheim, but later moved to Stuttgart to join her brothers, Christian, Johannes and Hubertus (1818–1839) after the death of their mother.

Once there, King William I allowed him to use a studio in the Old Castle and he became a travelling companion to Queen Olga.

He had three daughters, two of whom (Anna and Pietronella) also became painters. They received their first art lessons from him and their uncles.

Later he and the decorative artist, Hermann Herdtle, established the "Permanenten Kunstausstellung" (Permanent Art Exhibition) in Stuttgart which provided a way of exchanging ideas and works with painters in Munich.

Originally, he painted in a very strict Dutch Romantic style, but later turned more toward a type of atmospheric Impressionism.

From 1896 to 1903, he spent the summers with his family, working en plein aire at Schloss Köngen, a 13th century castle in Esslingen. Many of his works, and those of his daughters, may be seen at the Braith-Mali-Museum in Biberach an der Riß and at Schloss Köngen.

== Selected paintings ==
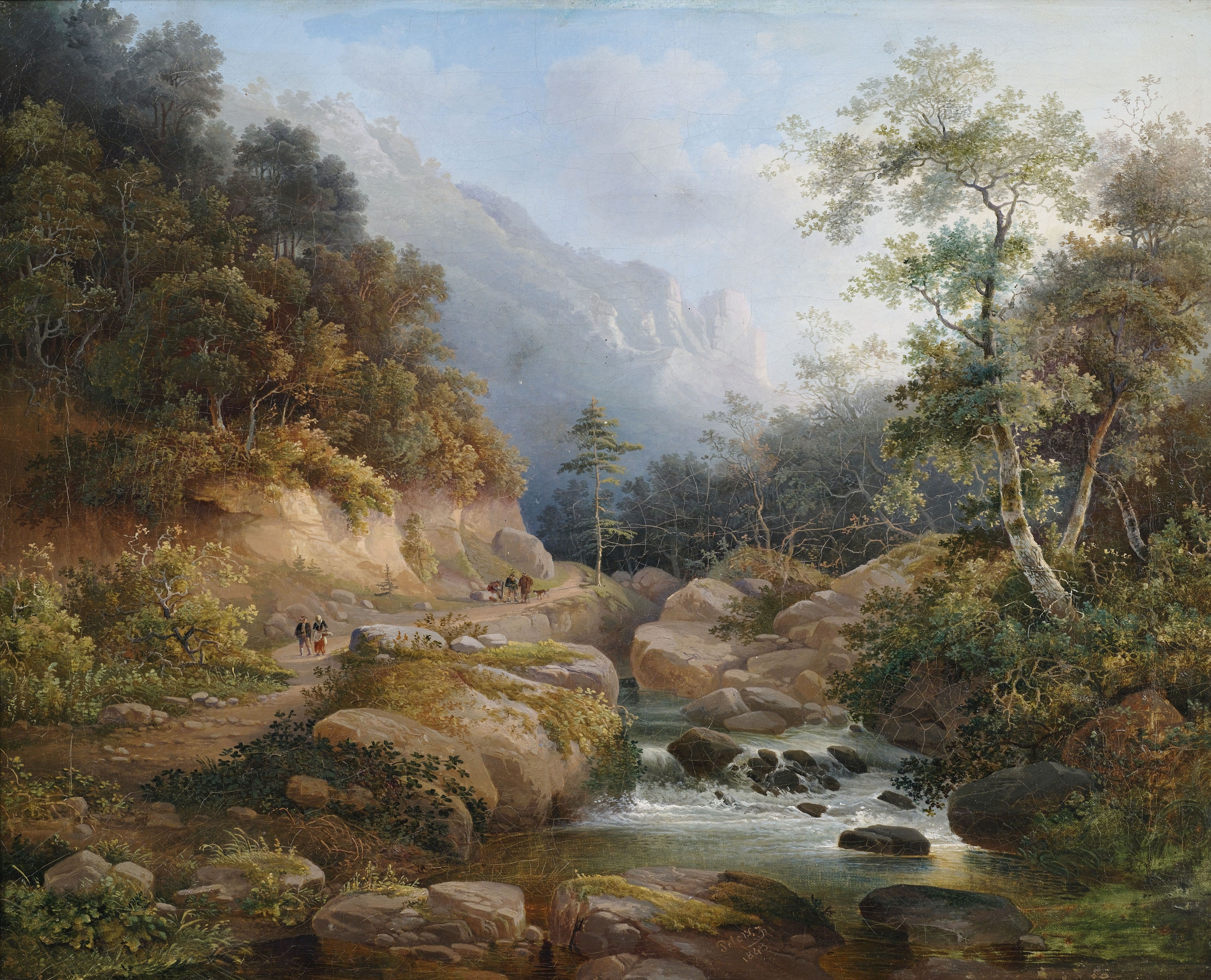
River Landscape

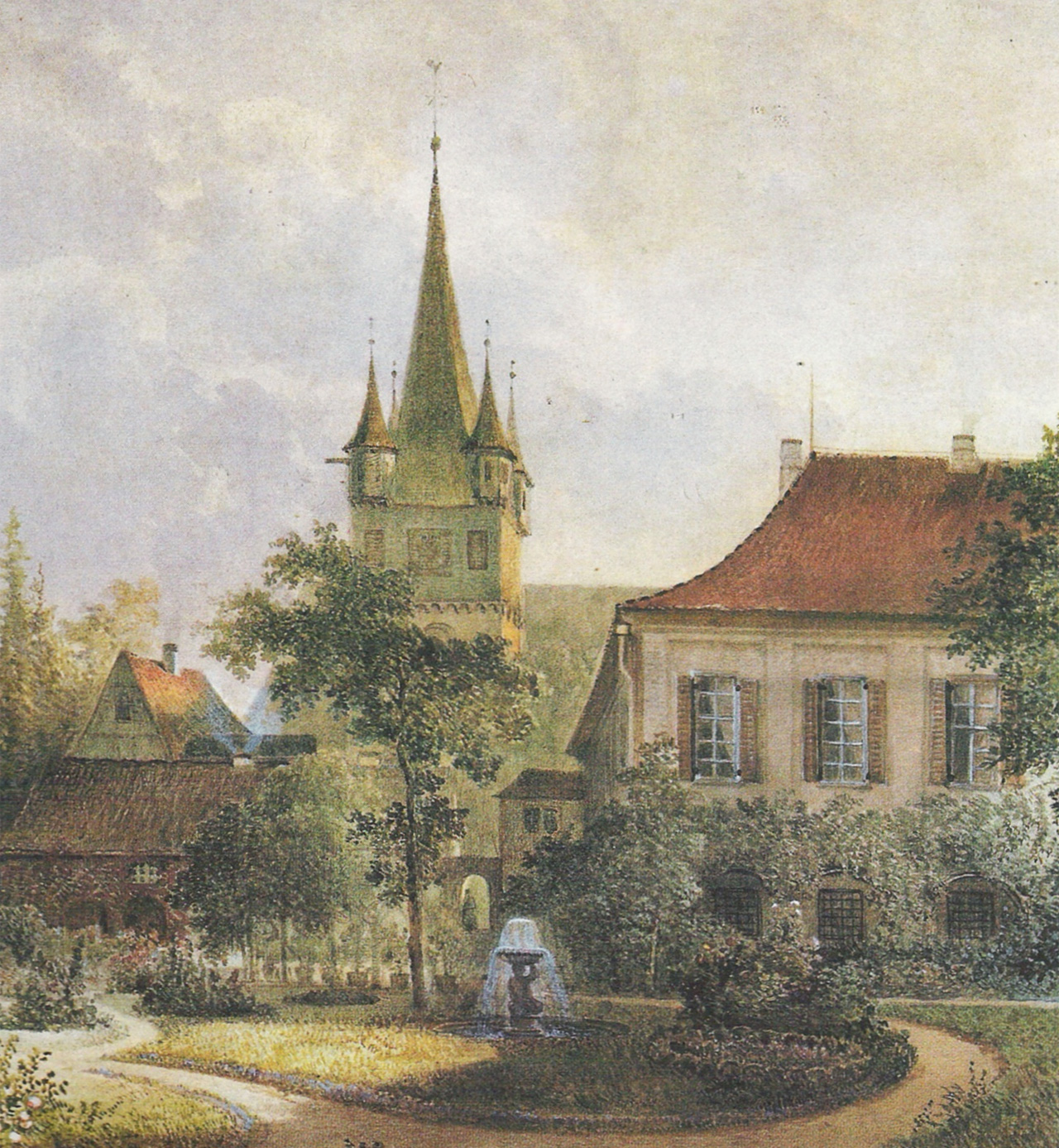
Schwaigern

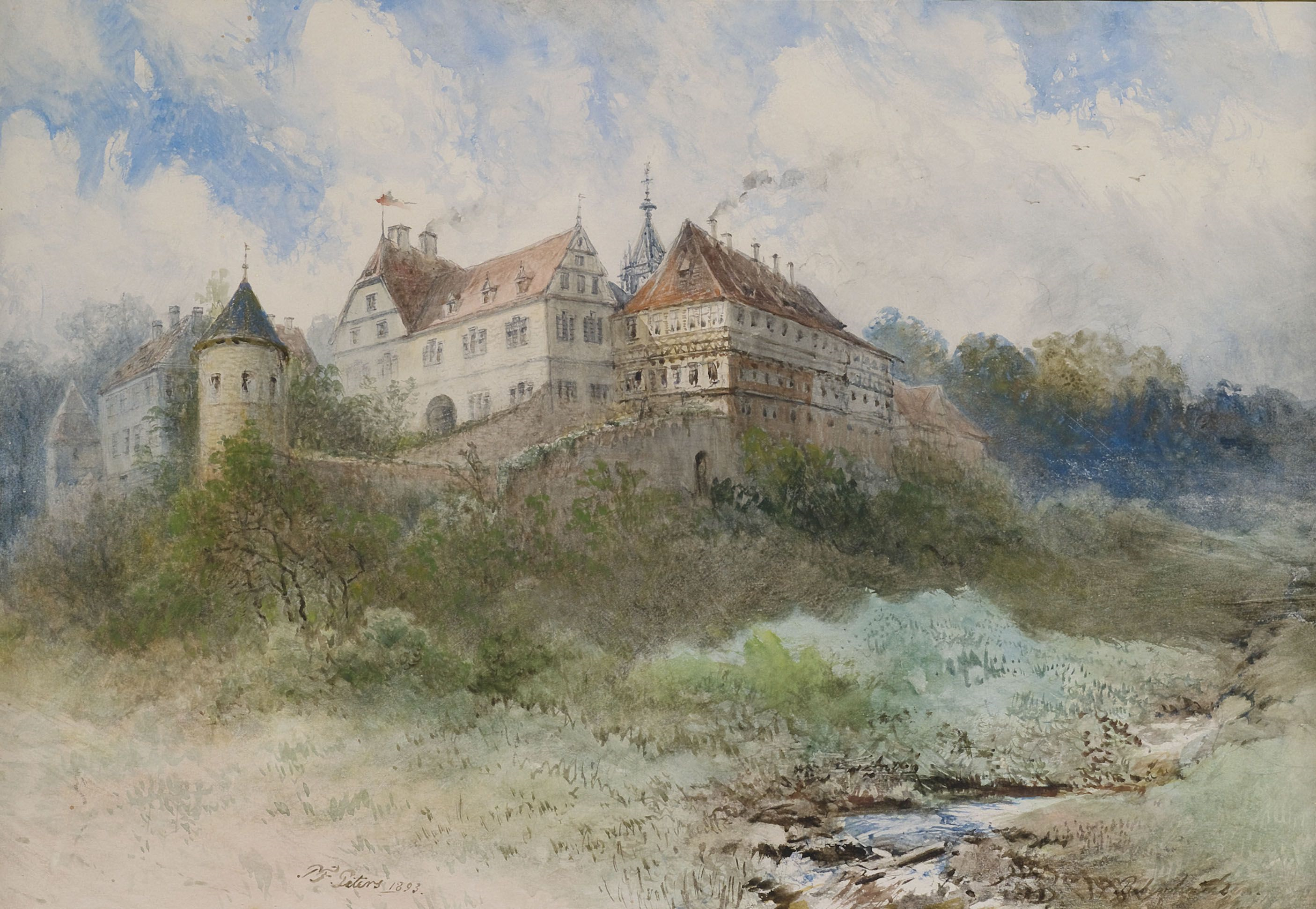
Bebenhausen

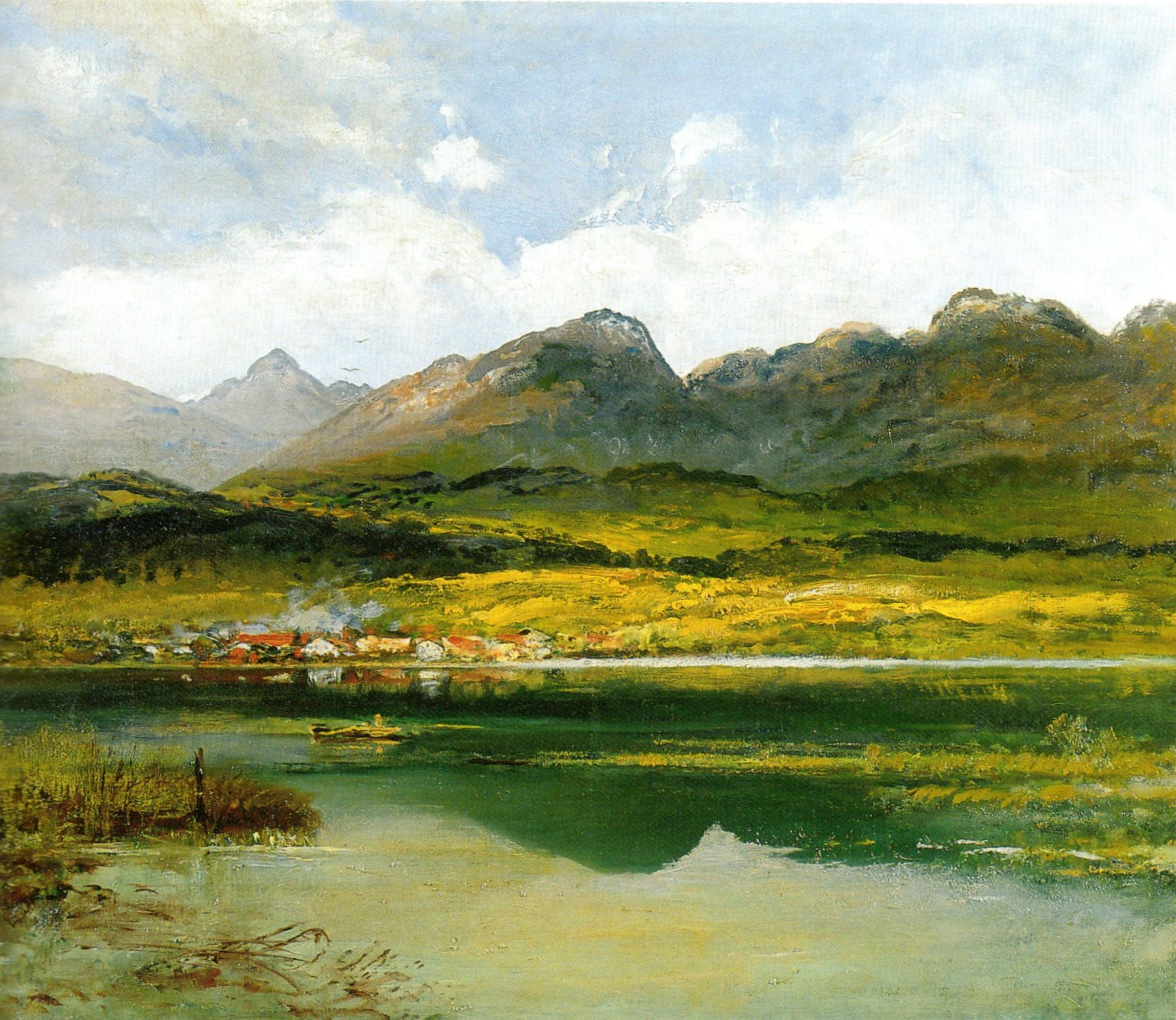
Lake Thun

== Sources ==
- Biographical data @ the RKD
- Anna Peters, ein "Malweib der ersten Stunde" @ Geschichtsverein.
- Monika Machnicki: Anna Peters. Vorwort zum Katalog zur Ausstellung "Anna Peters 1843 - 1926" im Braith-Mali-Museum in Biberach an der Riß, 1990, ISBN 3-924392-13-7
- Herbert Hoffmann, Kurt Diemer: Katalog der Gemälde und Skulpturen, Braith-Mali-Museum, Biberach an der Riß, 1975

== Collections ==
- Das Hohenzollern-Album von Pieter Francis Peters, Imhof Verlag, 2009 ISBN 3-86568-044-5,
