= Isabella Braun =

German writer

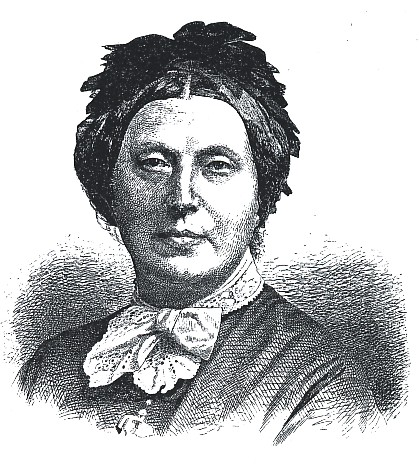
Isabella Braun

Isabella Braun (born 12 December 1815 in Jettingen, died 2 May 1886 in Munich) was a German writer.

== Biography ==
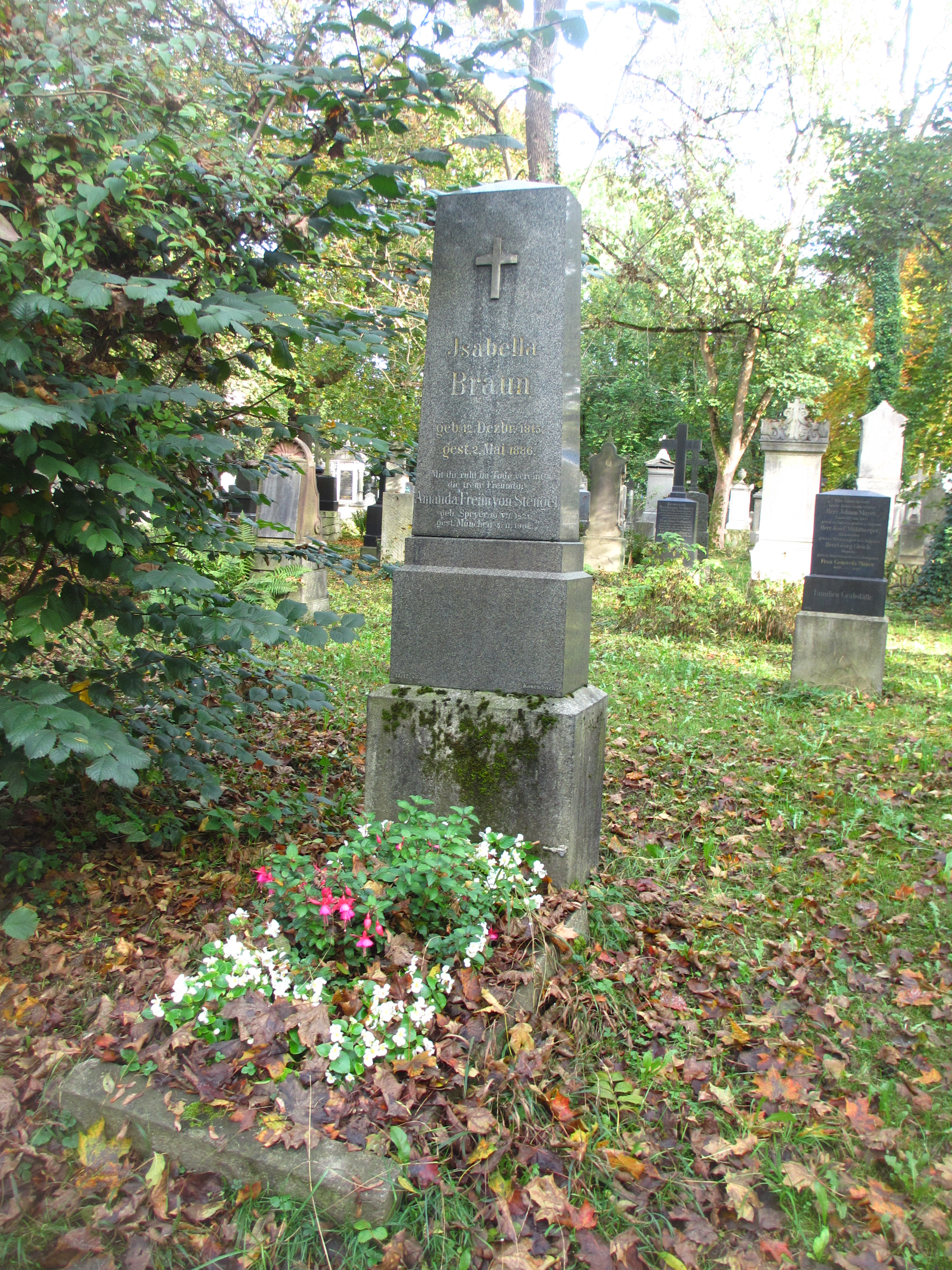
Grave of Isabella Braun at the old southern cemetery in Munich

Braun was the daughter of Bernhard Maria Braun, and his wife Euphemia. After her father's death in 1827, the family moved to Augsburg, where Isabella Braun attended secondary school until 1834. In 1836 she studied to become a teacher at the St. Ursula Teachers Training College in Augsburg, and a year later she was employed at the elementary school in Neuburg an der Donau. In 1848, the school was handed over to a monastery, and Isabella Braun was given early retirement. In her following years she devoted herself to writing youth literature.

Isabella Braun's first work, "Pictures from Nature", was published in 1849. She published numerous other works in the coming years that were published exclusively by Scheitlin in Stuttgart. In 1854, she moved to Muchich where she published works for a magazine under the title "Youth Papers for Christian Entertainment and Instruction.

== Selected works ==
- Pictures from nature (1849)
- Pictures from German History (1851)
- Little Stories (1851)
- Life Pictures (1856)
- In the green forest (1856, 1874 with illustration by Ferdinand Rothbart; from 1889 with illustration by Albert Richter )
- True Stories (1858)
- Name booklet (1861)
- Much (1867)
- From my youth (1871)
- Good evening (1879)
- Girl's Favorite Book (1880 as Der Mädchen liebstes Buch with illustrations from Pietronella Peters)
- Village stories (1882)
