= Georg Ebner =

German publisher (1784–1863)

Georg Christoph Albrecht Ebner (11 August 1784, Ludwigsburg - 17 April 1863, Stuttgart) was a German publisher.

== Biography ==
His father, Johann Friedrich Ebner, was an art publisher. He completed an apprenticeship at a bookstore in Ulm, owned by August Lebrecht Stettin, then worked at the Ritter Bookstore in Dresden, before taking over his father's company as "G. Ebnersche Kunsthandlung" in 1813. Shortly after, he married Wilhelmine Kurz (1789–1865), with whom he had twelve children. He mainly published illustrated books at first, including views of Württemberg and Lake Constance, as well as several books on various horse breeds.

He finally created his own lithographic firm. It was there that the landscape painter and lithographer, Eberhard Emminger, served his apprenticeship in 1822, and the future publisher, Jakob Ferdinand Schreiber, worked from 1828 to 1831. After purchasing a shop that sold musical scores, he renamed his company "G. Ebnersche Kunst- und Musikalienhandlung" (art and music seller). In 1833, he was one of the founders of the Allgemeinen Rentenanstalt, the first pension insurance company in Germany (still in business as the Württembergische Lebensversicherung).

Shortly before his fiftieth wedding anniversary, he was killed during construction work at his home. Stepping on a loose board, he fell two floors and was knocked unconscious. He died four hours later. Following a funeral service by the famous Prelate, Sixt Karl Kapff, he was interred at the Hoppenlaufriedhof.
