= Eberhard Emminger =

German lithographer and painter

Markus Eberhard Emminger
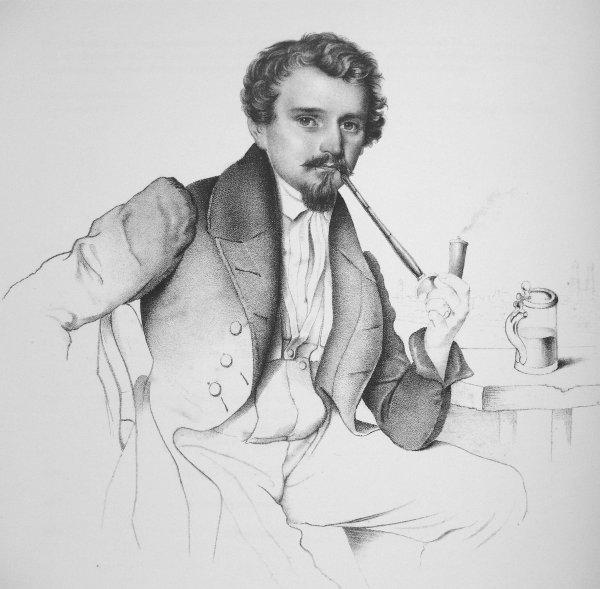
- Born: October 21, 1808
- Died: November 27, 1885 (aged 77)
- Known for: Lithography; landscape painting

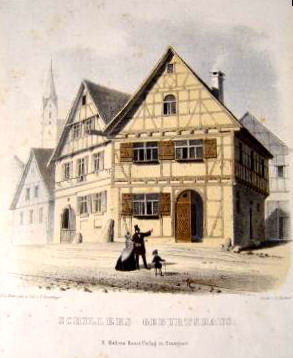
Schiller's Birthplace (1850)

Markus Eberhard Emminger (21 October 1808, in Biberach an der Riß – 27 November 1885, in Biberach an der Riß) was a German lithographer and landscape painter.

== Life ==
His father was a glazier. As a student at elementary school, he took art lessons from Johann Baptist Pflug until the age of thirteen. At that time, he was apprenticed to the book publisher Georg Ebner in Stuttgart where he received lessons in business, as well as drawing and engraving. He was self-taught as a lithographer and was allowed to work independently, even during his apprenticeship. After that, he became a student of Johann Friedrich Dieterich. During these years he produced many genre paintings based on sketches by other artists.

Thanks to a royal grant, he travelled through Italy for a year, then settled in Munich in 1836, where he spent another year studying at the Academy of Fine Arts. In 1837, he passed his final examinations.

Although he was now married, he continued to lead a wandering life, travelling throughout the Rhine Valley, Southern Germany, Italy and Austria, producing lithographs of all the areas he visited. In 1854, he resettled in Munich. His son and his wife both died in 1873. He remarried shortly thereafter and returned to Stuttgart. He was there for only five years, however, before he moved again; back to his home town of Biberach, where he died from a fit of apoplexy.

== Publications ==
- Landschaftliches Bild der Höhenverhältnisse Württembergs, nach den neuesten amtlichen Messungen entworfen und hrsg. von H. Braun. Lithographie mit Tonplatte von M. E. Emminger. Fritzschke, München um 1880
- Albert Moll, August Pleibel: Die Schwäbische Alb. Eine Schilderung ihrer schönsten und interessantesten Punkte. Mit 19 lithographischen Ansichten von Eb. Emminger, C. Schacher und J. Wölffle. Ausgaben 1860 und 1865 (Reprinted: Weidlich, Frankfurt am Main, 1976, ISBN 3-8035-8905-3)
