= Jettingen (Baden-Württemberg) =

- Municipality
- Coat of arms

- Location of Jettingen within Böblingen district
- Interactive map of Jettingen
- Location within Germany Location within Baden-Württemberg
- Coordinates: 48°34′1″N 8°46′51″E
- Country: Germany
- State: Baden-Württemberg
- Admin. region: Stuttgart
- District: Böblingen
- Subdivisions: 3

Government
  - Mayor (2020–28): Hans Michael Burkhardt

Area
  - Total: 21.11 km^{2} (8.15 sq mi)
- Elevation: 559–585 m (1,834–1,919 ft)

Population (2025-12-31)
  - Total: 8,064
  - Density: 382.0/km^{2} (989.4/sq mi)
- Time zone: UTC+01:00 (CET)
  - Summer (DST): UTC+02:00 (CEST)
- Postal codes: 71131
- Dialling codes: 07452
- Vehicle registration: BB
- Website: www.jettingen.de

Jettingen (German pronunciation: [ˈjɛtɪŋən]) is a municipality in the district of Böblingen in Baden-Württemberg in Germany.

== Bilder ==
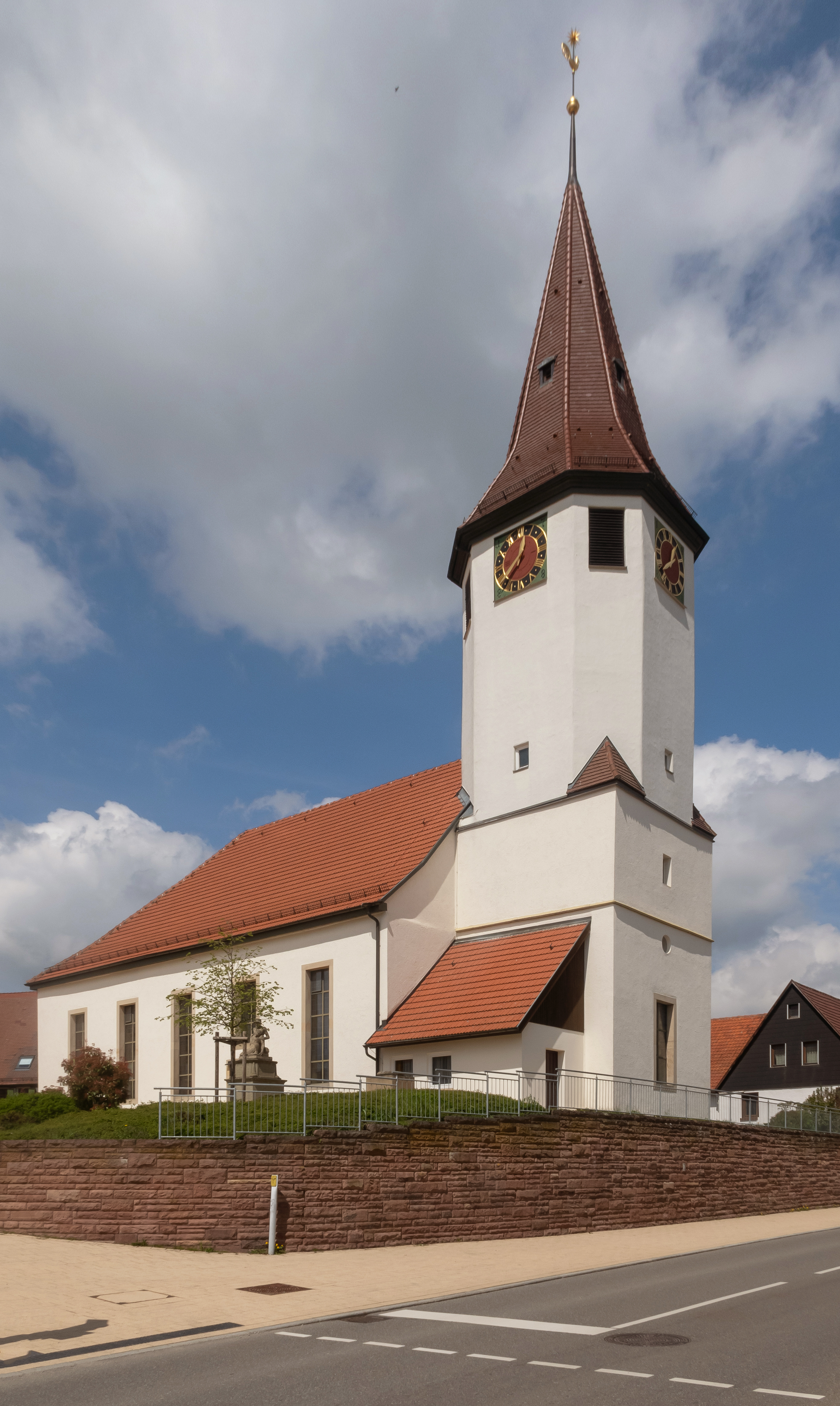
Oberjettingen, reformed church

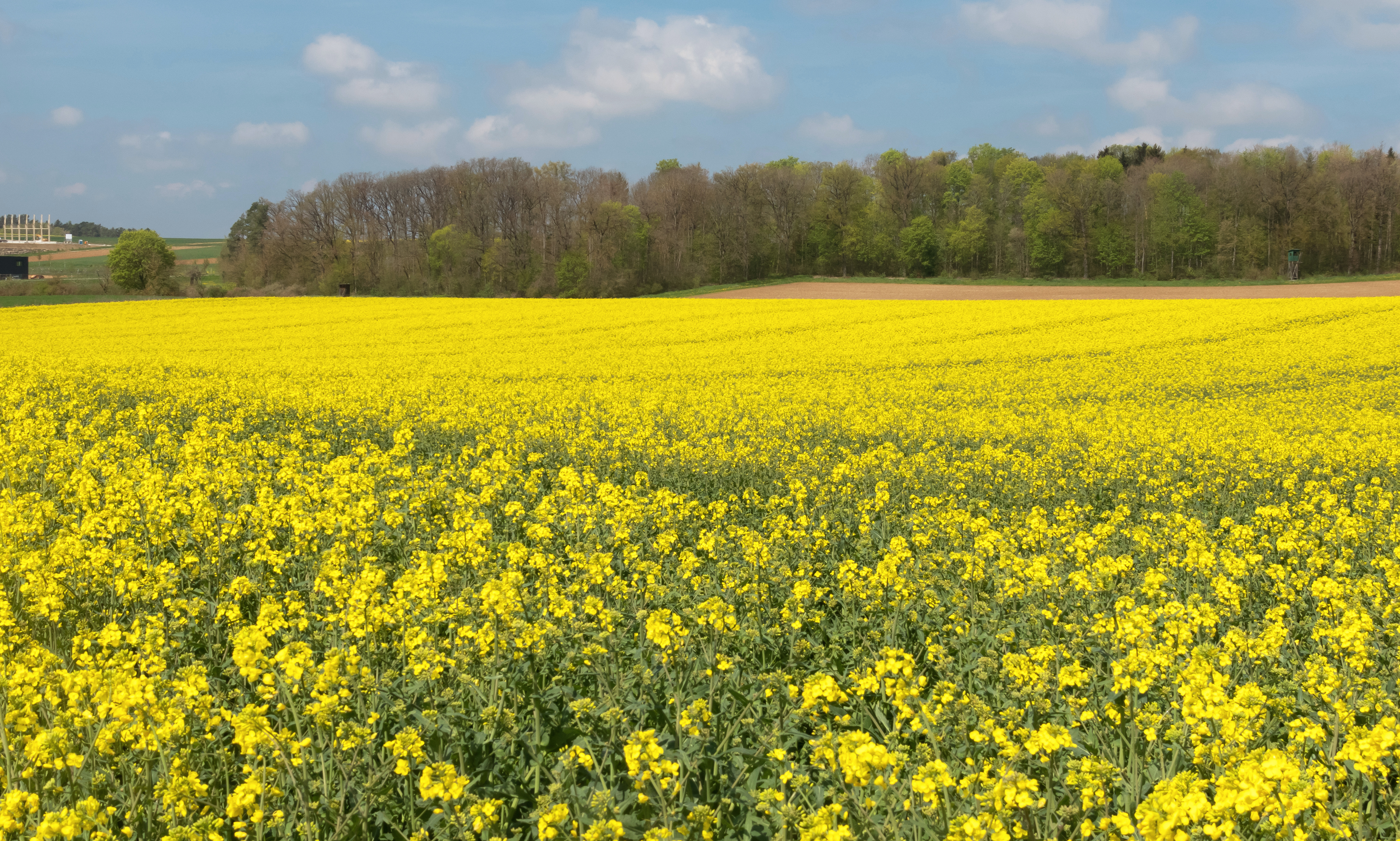
near Unterjettingen, field with rapeseed

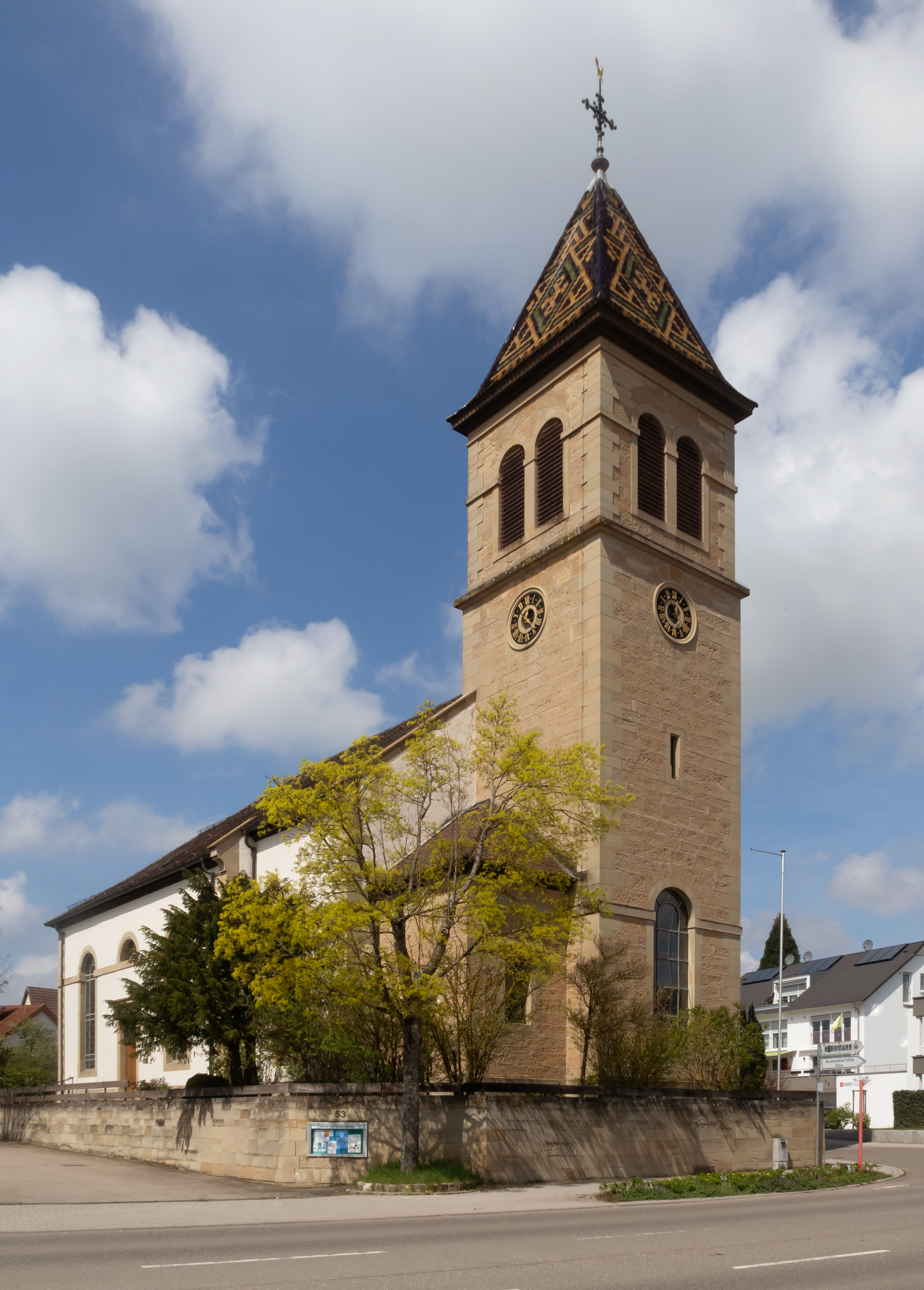
Unterjettingen, church: Michaelskirche

== People ==
- Isabella Braun (1815-1886), German writer
