= Anna Peters (painter) =

German painter

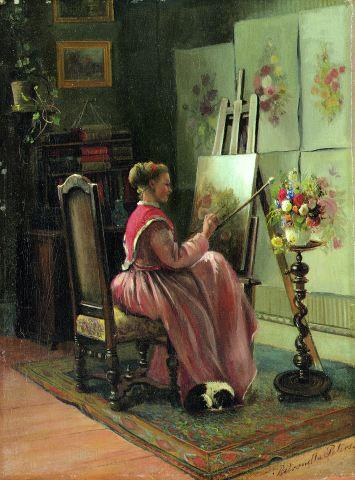
Anna Peters at the easel, a painting by her sister, Pietronella (c. 1870)

Anna Peters (28 February 1843, Mannheim – 26 June 1926, Stuttgart) was a German painter remembered for her flower paintings and landscapes. She was the daughter and pupil of the Dutch landscape painter Pieter Francis Peters.

== Biography ==
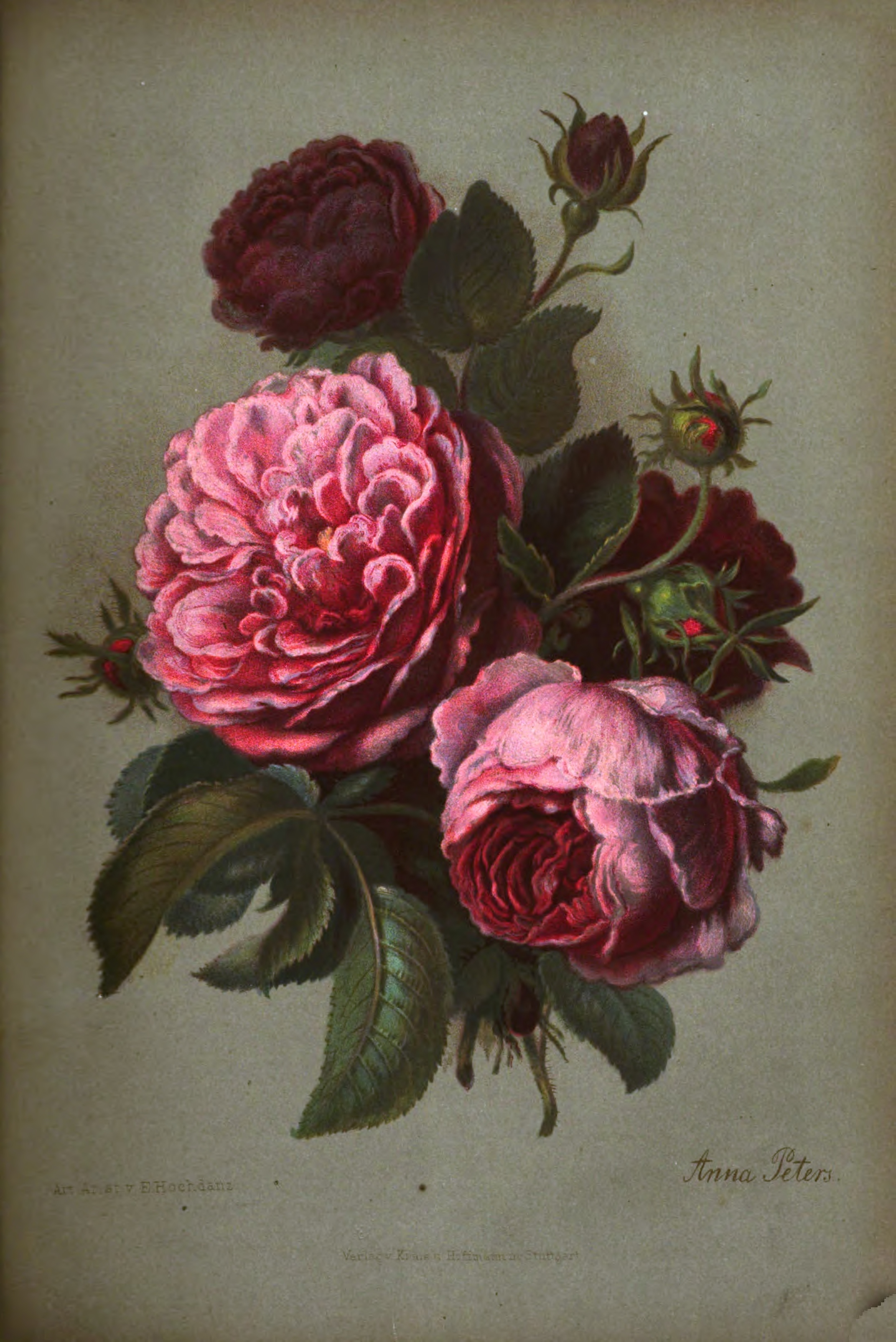
Roses

Peters was born in Mannheim on 28 February 1843, the daughter of the Dutch landscape painter Pieter Francis Peters (1818-1903) and his wife Heinrike Gertrude Mali (died 1884). Her grandfather had worked as a glass painter in Nijmegen. Her mother was a sister of Christian Mali, a wildlife painter of the Munich school. In 1845, the family moved to Stuttgart, where Peters lived with her sisters, Pietronella Peters (1848-1924) and Ida Peters. Pietronella achieved success as a genre-painter. Anna remained unmarried.

Peters was the first woman in Germany who was able to make a living from the sale of her paintings. During the summer months she regularly visited Schloss Köngen to the southeast of Stuttgart, where she and her sisters had a studio where they were able to develop their artistic skills. Her works include drawings, watercolours and oil paintings—her first known picture dates to 1860. Peters began to produce flower paintings and village landscapes. In Schloss Köngen, she met Christian Mali and his artist friend Anton Braith. The focus of her work continued to be mainly paintings of flowers and plants in the traditional Dutch century style. They frequently consisted on bouquets with grasses and twigs, occasionally with insects. She produced several landscapes, a few pictures of children, and added decorations to royal castles at Stuttgart and Friedrichshafen. She won medals for her work in 1873, 1874, 1876, and 1877. In the late 1890s, her style became increasingly impressionistic. She regularly took part in exhibitions after 1896 in Berlin, Munich, Dresden and Vienna. In 1900 she produced a painting of Schloss Köngen itself.

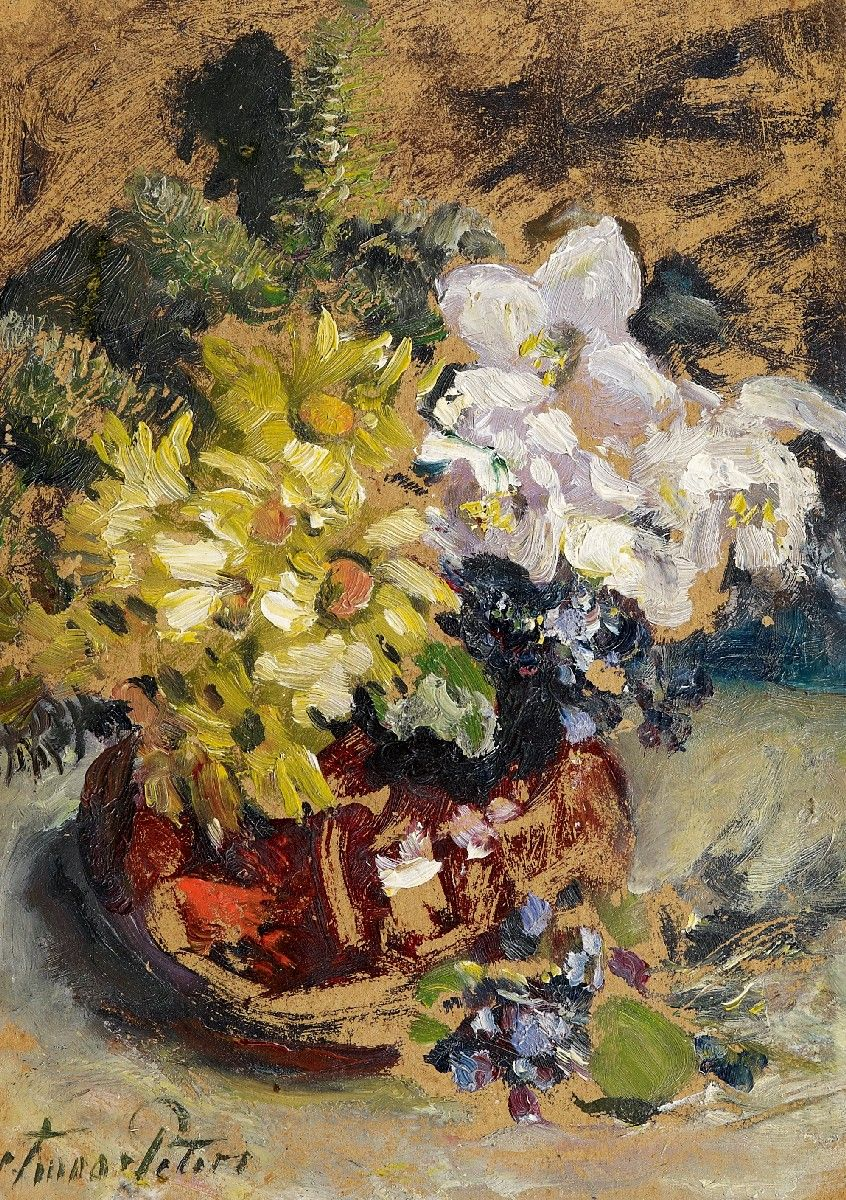
Floral Still-Life

Peters was a member of the state political association of female Berlin artists (Berliner Künstlerinnen) from 1880. She was co-founder of the Württemberg Painters Association, which she chaired from 1893 to 1902 and from 1904 to 1919. She also organized exhibitions and hosted social events, seeking to overcome some of the reservations about women painters of the times, campaigning for their social recognition.

Peters's final years from 1912 were spent with her sisters in her home in Stuttgart-Sonnenberg, where she died on June 26, 1926. The Anna-Peters Road in Stuttgart is named after her.

== Bibliography ==
- Grolier Club (1901). Catalogue of a Collection of Engravings, Etchings and Lithographs by Women: Exhibited at the Grolier Club, April 12 to 27, 1901 (Public domain ed.). Grolier Club. p. 81.
- Hengstenberg, Gisela (2003). Rübezahl im Königsbau: die Stuttgarter Künstlergesellschaft "Das Strahlende Bergwerk". Hohenheim. ISBN 978-3-89850-977-0.
- Maier, Thomas; Müllerschön, Bernd (2000). Die Schwäbische Malerei um 1900 (in German). Edition Thombe. ISBN 978-3-935252-00-3.
- Neumann, Edith (1999). Künstlerinnen in Württemberg: zur Geschichte des Württembergischen Malerinnen-Vereins und des Bundes Bildender Künstlerinnen Württembergs. Klett-Cotta. ISBN 978-3-608-94192-0.
- Reuter, Fritz (1935). Fritz Reuter und Fritz Peters, Siedenbollentin: erste vollständige Ausgabe der Briefe Reuters an Peters, mit lebensgeschichtlichen Schilderungen (in German). Hinstorffsche Verlagsbuchhandlung.
- Riepl-Schmidt, Maja (1990). Wider das verkochte und verbügelte Leben: Frauen-Emanzipation in Stuttgart seit 1800 (in German). Silberburg-Verlag. ISBN 978-3-925344-64-0.
