= Braith-Mali-Museum =

Museum Biberach
- Hospital zum Heiligen Geist
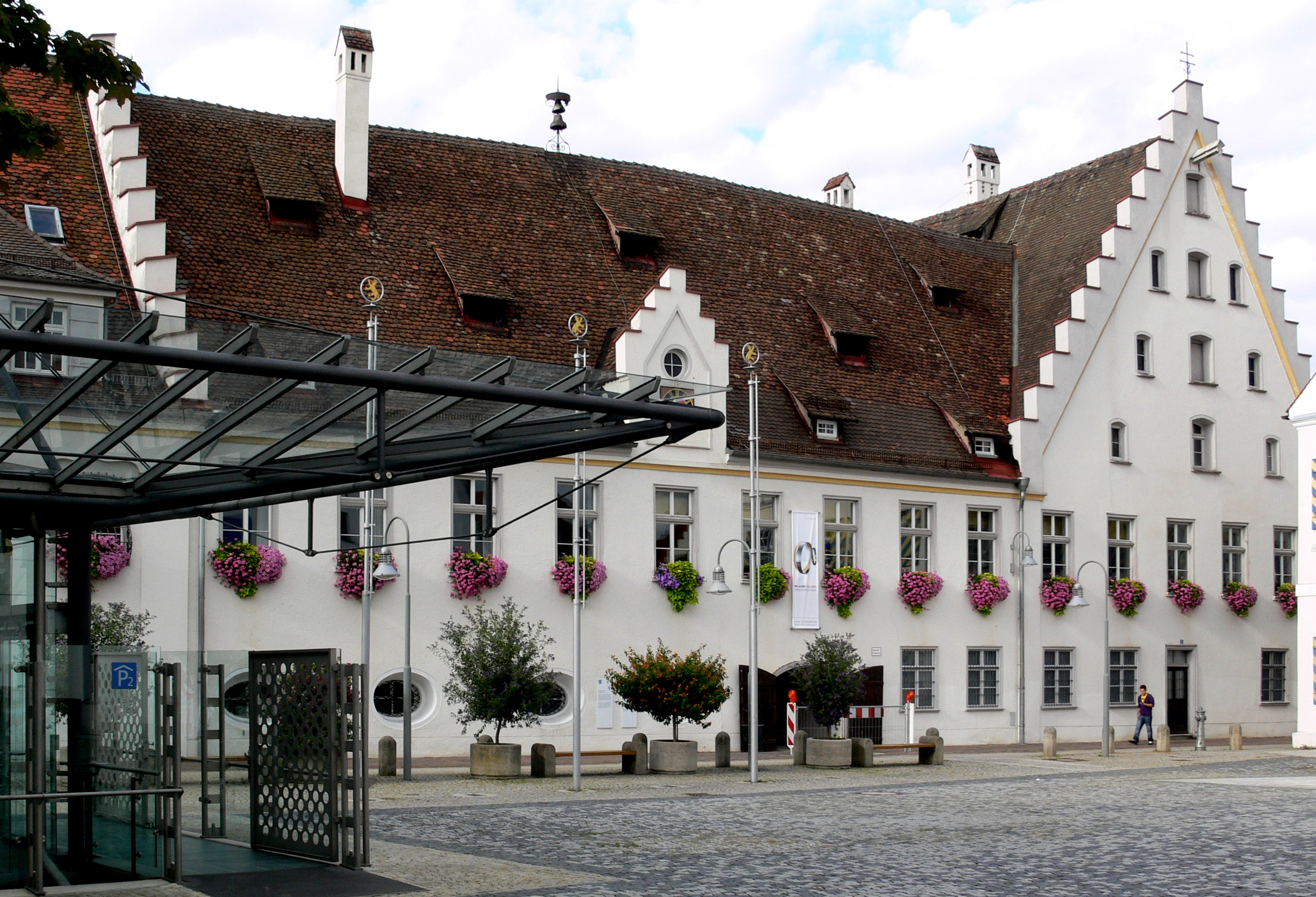
- Museum Biberach

- Location within Baden-Württemberg
- Established: 1902
- Location: Museum Biberach; Museumstraße 6; 88400 Biberach an der Riss; Germany
- Coordinates: 48.09792°N 9.79015°E
- Type: Museum with different collections
- Key holdings: Paintings and woodcuts of the expressionist Ernst Ludwig Kirchner, Historical artist's studios
- Collections: Natural history, Art, History, Archaeology, Weaving
- Owner: City of Biberach an der Riss
- Website: www.museum-biberach.de (in German)

The Museum Biberach is a museum with several sections in Biberach an der Riss in Upper Swabia. The museum resides in one of the oldest and biggest buildings from the 16th century in this city. It belongs to the considerable collections in Baden-Württemberg.

On 2.800 square meters it presents archaeology, history, art and natural history. Models, all sorts of installations, and computer animations explain the origin and settlement of the Upper Swabian landscape. The collections reveal the life and the terms of employment of the people, such as the notable weaving in the town since the 17th century. Prominent pieces of art from former times until the present enrich the knowledge of the visitors.

The art-historical division gathers key works of art of the Upper Swabian region and the important works of the German expressionist Ernst Ludwig Kirchner.

== History ==
Since 1898 numerous founders and sponsors laid the basis for a Biberach civil museum which was opened in 1902 in the historical rooms of the hospital to the Holy Ghost (German: Hospital zum Heiligen Geist).

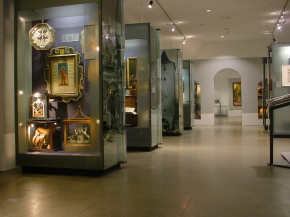
View into the town's historical section

A legacy from the Munich painters Anton Braith (a Biberachian by birth, 1836–1905) and Christian Mali (1832–1906) in the years 1905–1908 bequeathed their representative and richly equipped atelier rooms to the museum. Today the Braith Mali drawing rooms are the only completely preserved artist's studios from the 19th century.

== Collections ==
The museum encloses the divisions:

1. Natural history with realistically formed biotopes.
2. Archaeology of Upper Swabia (among other the collection of the Biberach dentist and pioneering archaeologist Heinrich Forschner (1880–1959)). Exhibits document the settlement of Upper Swabia back to the ages of Celts, ancient Romans and Alemanni as far as to the Bronze Age and Stone Age 13,000 years ago. This collection encloses about 22,000 finds from more than 300 usually Upper Swabian sites.
3. Gothic art
4. Art from the 17th to the 19th century (with works from Johann Heinrich Schönfeld and Johann Baptist Pflug as well as the painter's family of Pieter Francis Peters (1818–1903) from Stuttgart).
5. Historical artist's studios of the animal painters Anton Braith and Christian Mali from the 19th century.
6. Gallery of the modernist art with works from Jakob Bräckle (including his studio), Julius Kaesdorf, Romane Holderried Kaesdorf and paintings and graphics from Ernst Ludwig Kirchner.
7. History of the Free Imperial City of Biberach, under it tin toys from the probable oldest manufacturer Rock & Graner.

An information point in the stairwell presents designer Heinz H. Engler.

A 3-D model of the city of Biberach in the ground floor can be visited without admission fee and is also shown on town guidances.

Samples of the exhibits
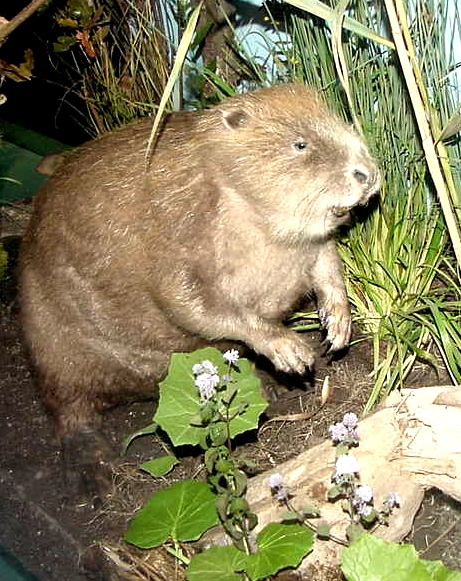
Is the city's name of Biberach derived from this animal (German: Biber)?

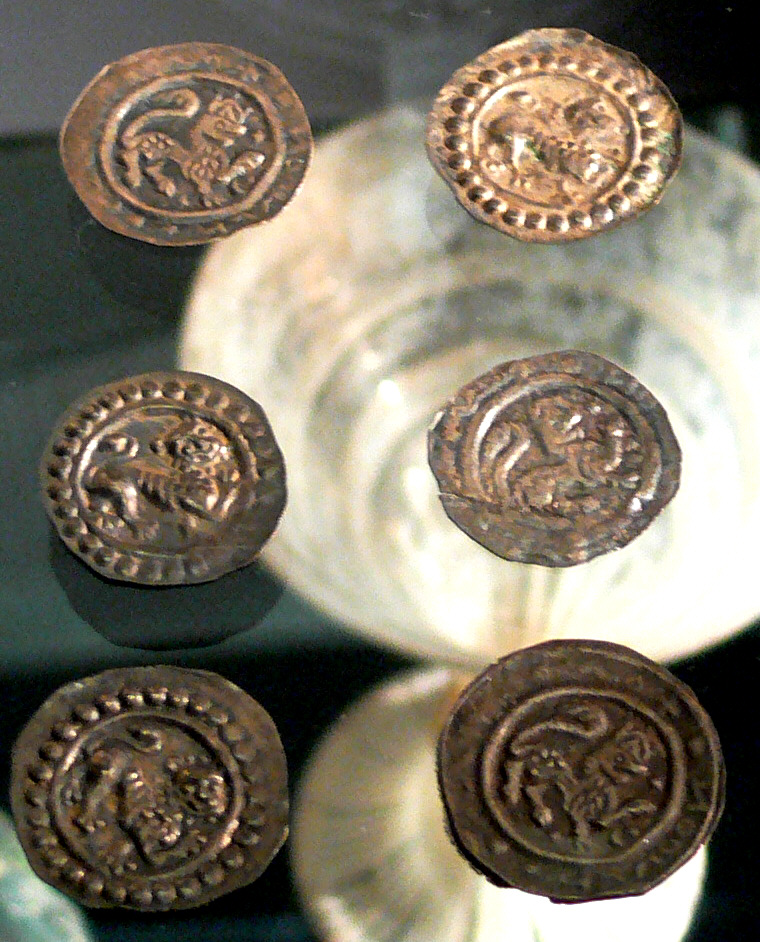
Bracteates, Biberach c. 1220

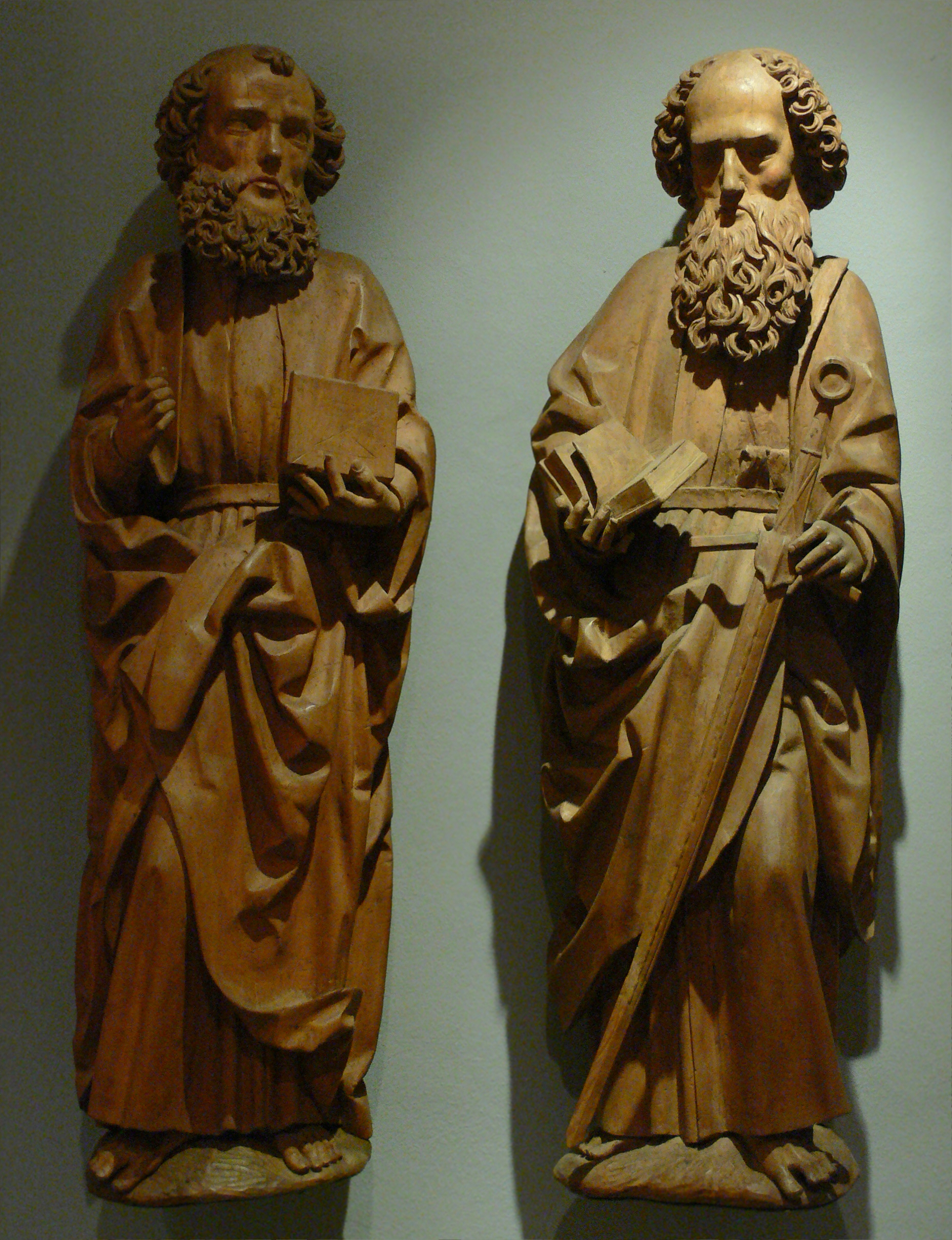
Workshop of Niklaus Weckmann: Apostles Petrus & Paulus, lime wood, Ulm, c. 1500

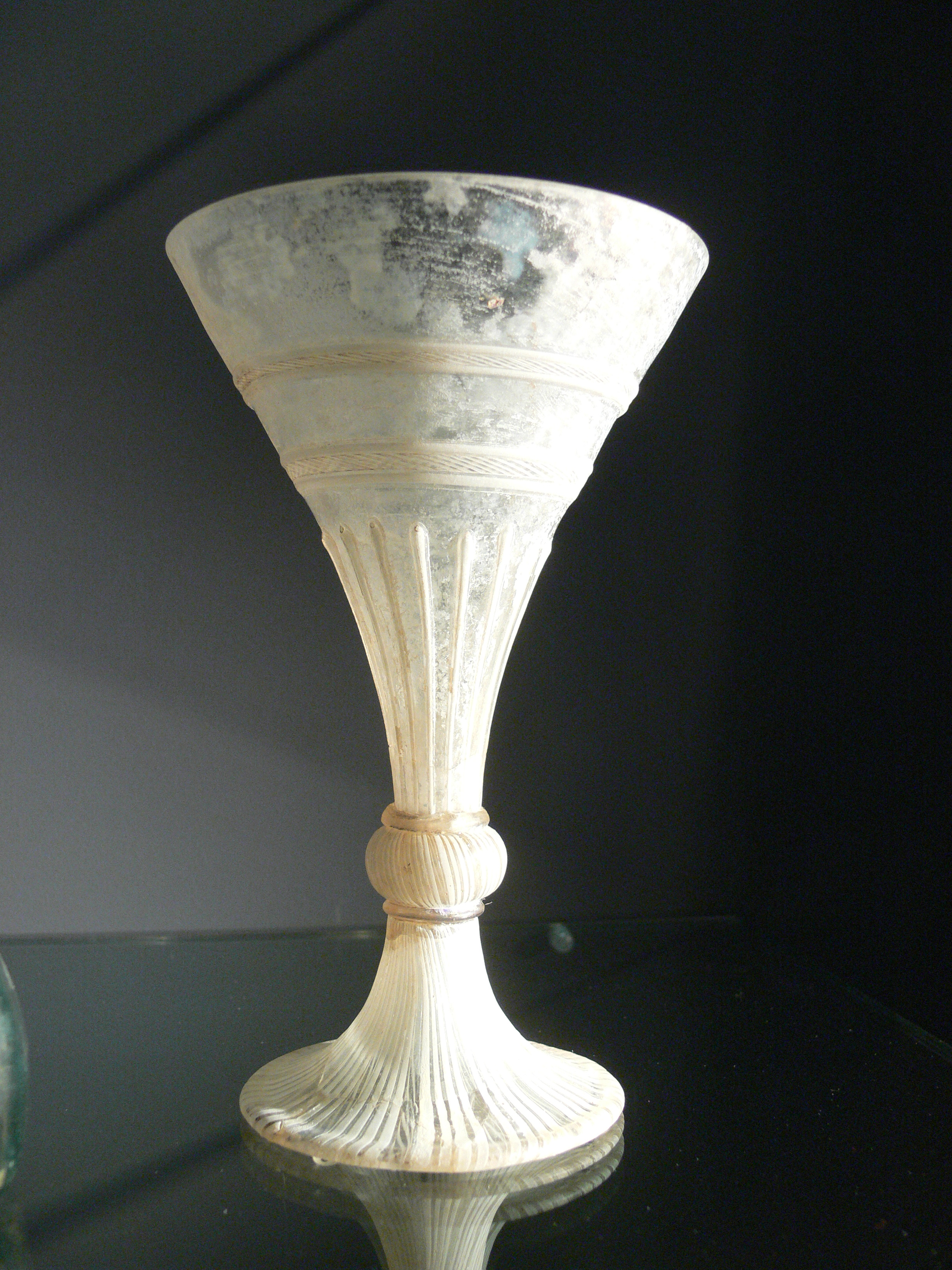
Goblet, Venetian glass, 16th century, latrine find

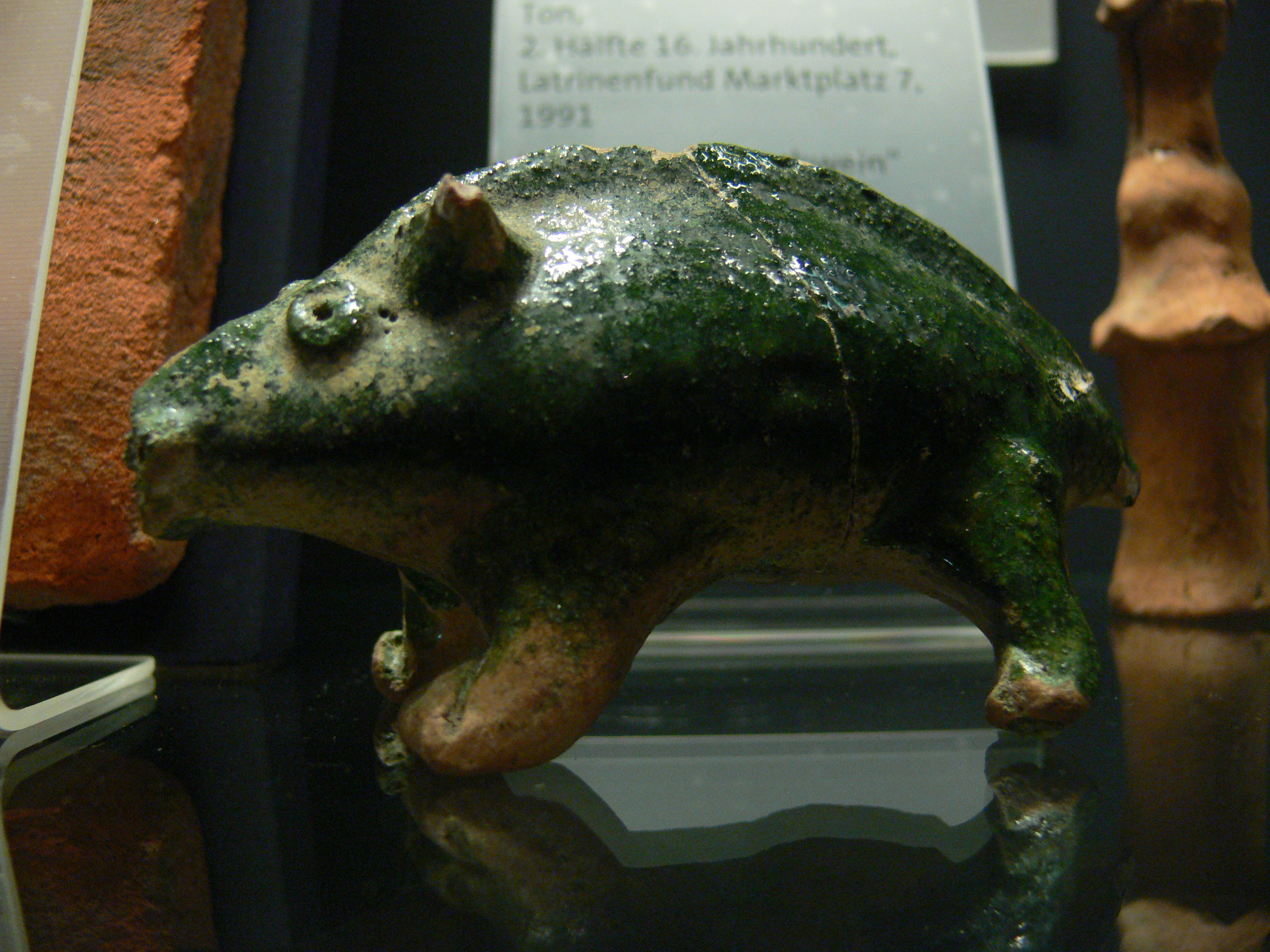
Piggy bank from the 2nd half 16th century, probably a mascot

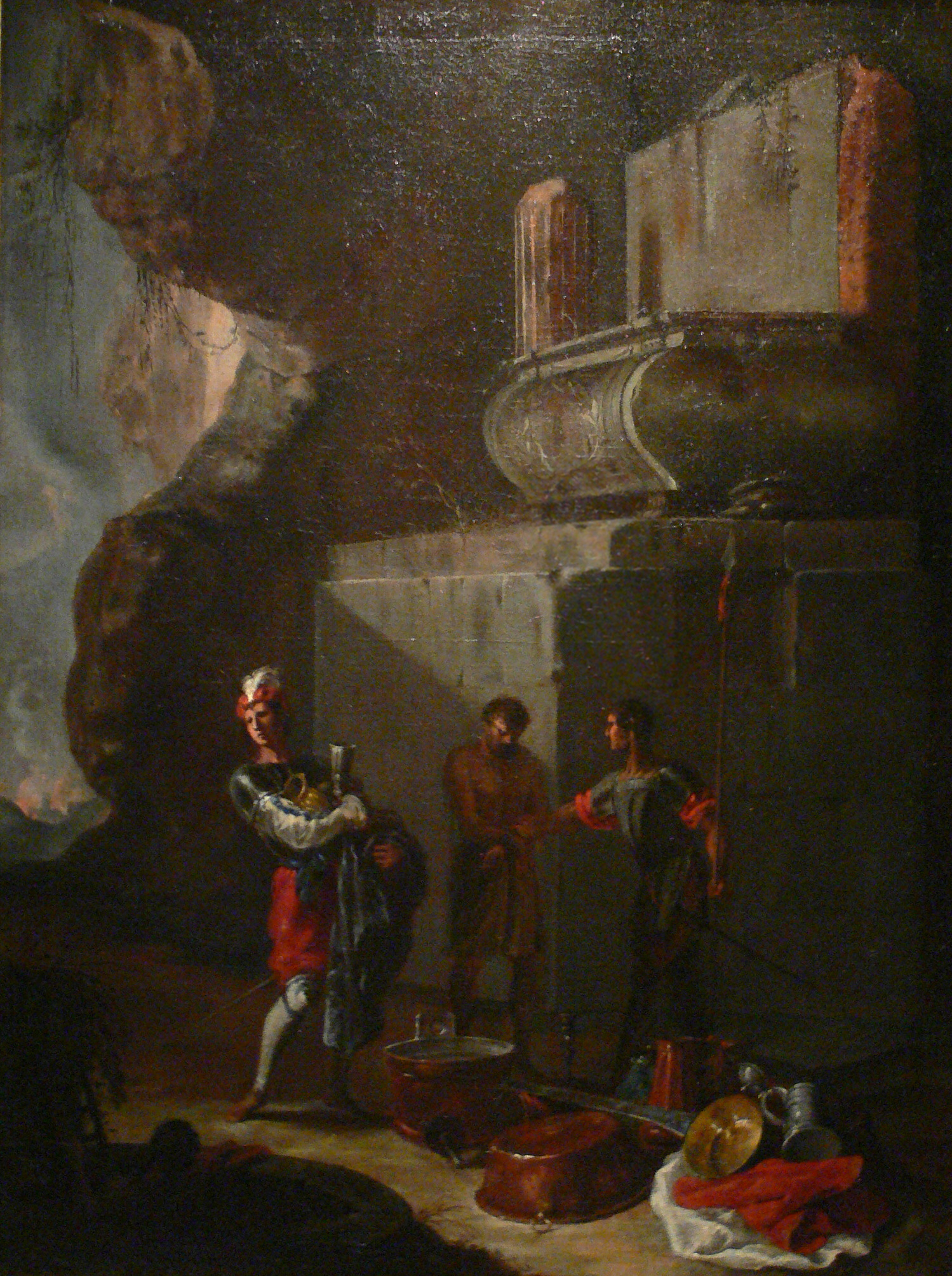
Johann Heinrich Schönfeld: The Plunderers, oil on canvas, around 1635

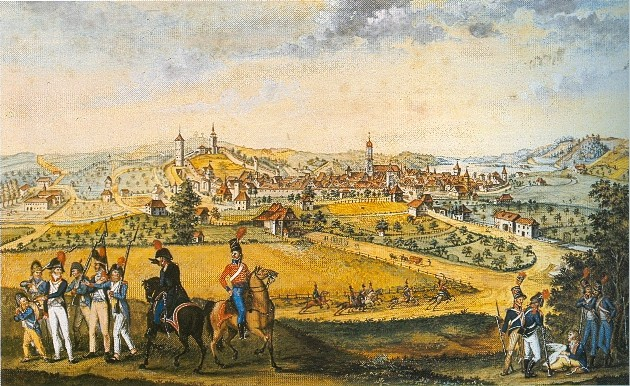
Johann Sebastian Dürr: French soldiers in front of Biberach, gouache, c. 1800 (see Battle of Biberach (1800))

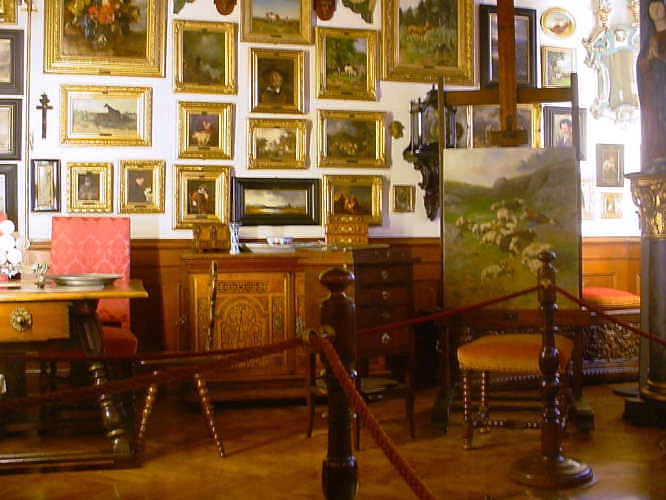
Historical studio of the painter Anton Braith, 19th century

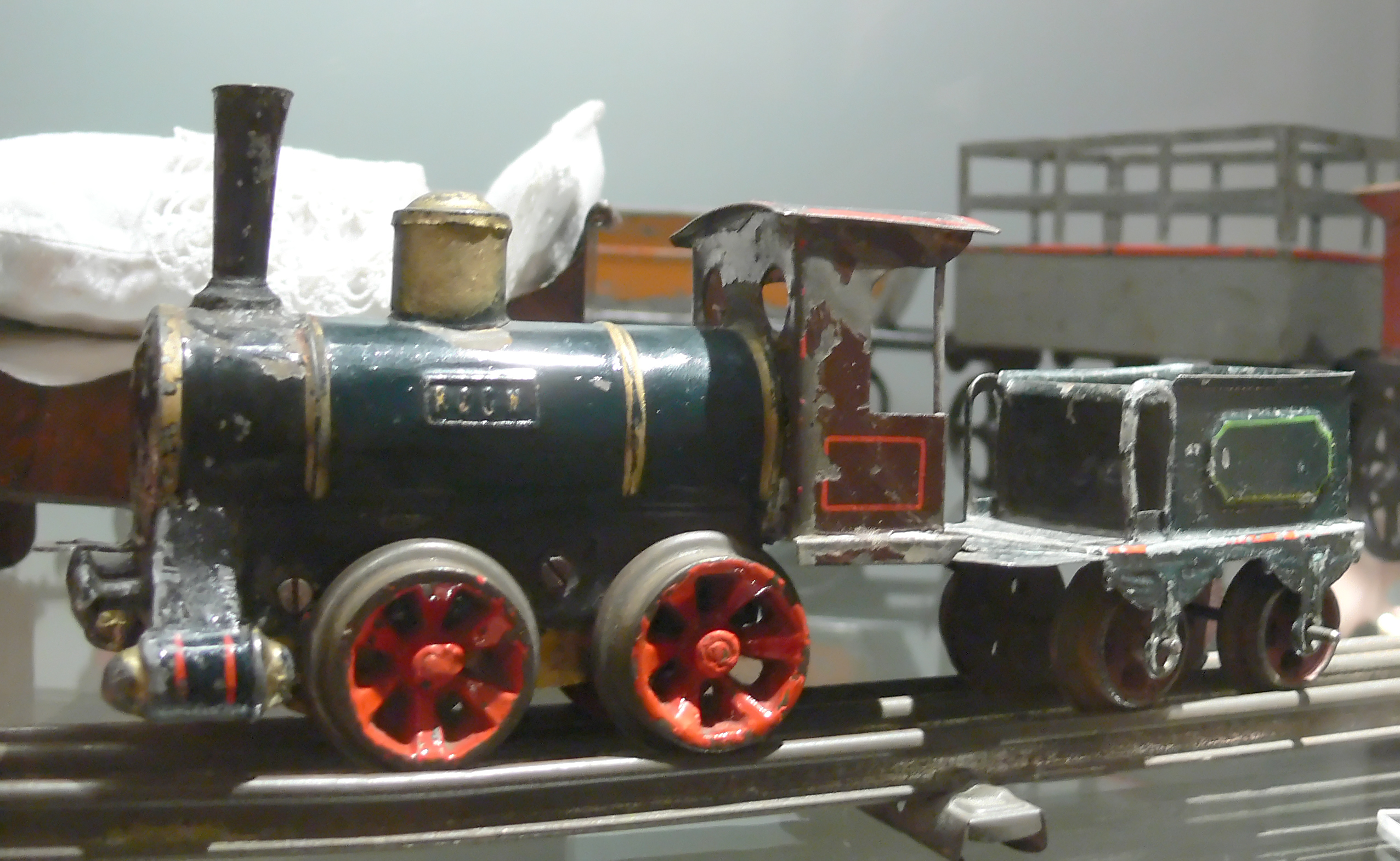
Tin toy from Rock & Graner, around 1900

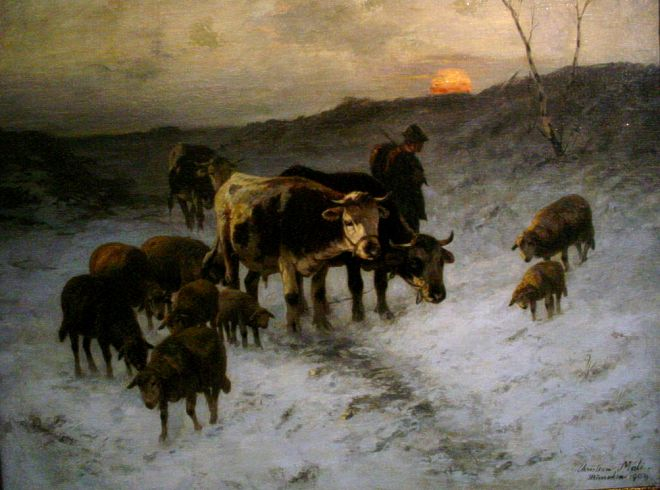
Christian Mali: Winter evening after the cattle market, oil on canvas, 1904, detail

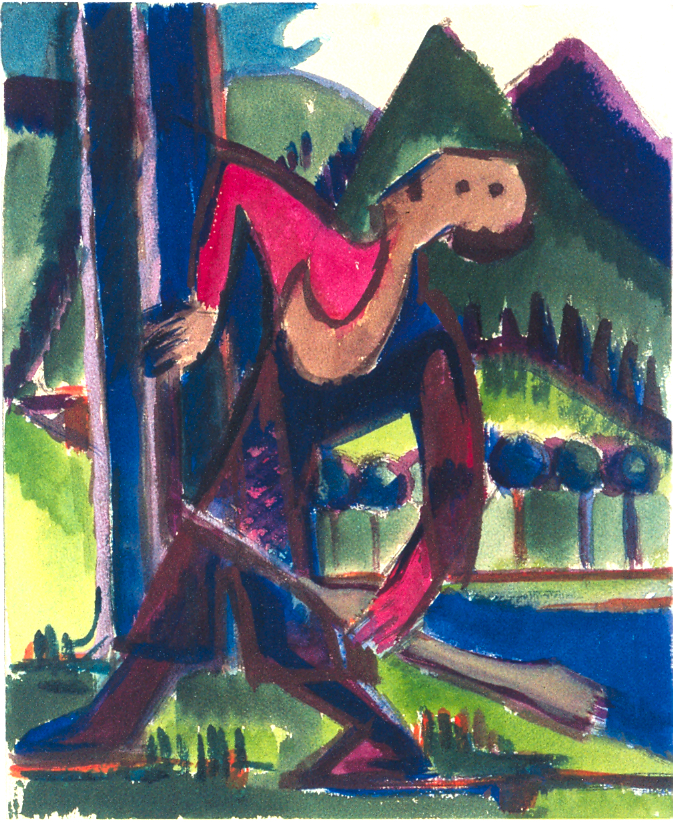
Ernst Ludwig Kirchner: Boy with arrow (Hunter in the wood), water colour, 33,4 x 26,9 cm, 1928

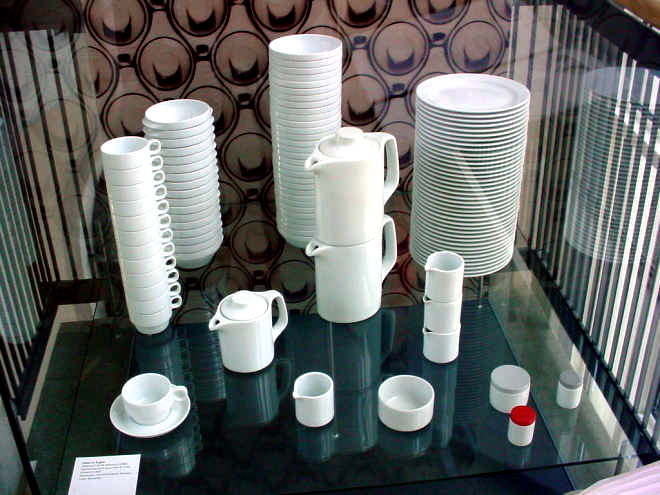
Dishes "B 1100", Heinz H. Engler
Museum Biberach

== Literature ==
- Büchner, Dieter (17 February 2011). "Zwei Münchner Malerfürsten in Biberach" [Two Munich painter principals in Biberach]. Denkmalpflege in Baden-Württemberg [Historic Preservation in Baden-Württemberg] (PDF) (in German). Landesamt für Denkmalpflege im Regierungspräsidium Stuttgart in Verbindung mit den Fachreferaten für Denkmalpflege in den Regierungspräsidien. p. 61 ff. Archived from the original (PDF) on 2015-09-23.

== See also ==
- List of museums in Germany
