= Anton Braith =

German painter

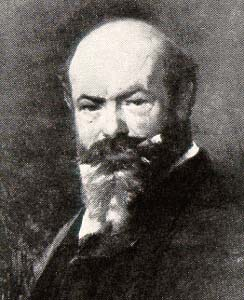
Anton Braith, self-portrait

Anton Braith (2 September 1836 – 3 January 1905) was a German landscape and animal painter. He was also a professor at the Academy of Fine Arts Munich.

== Life ==
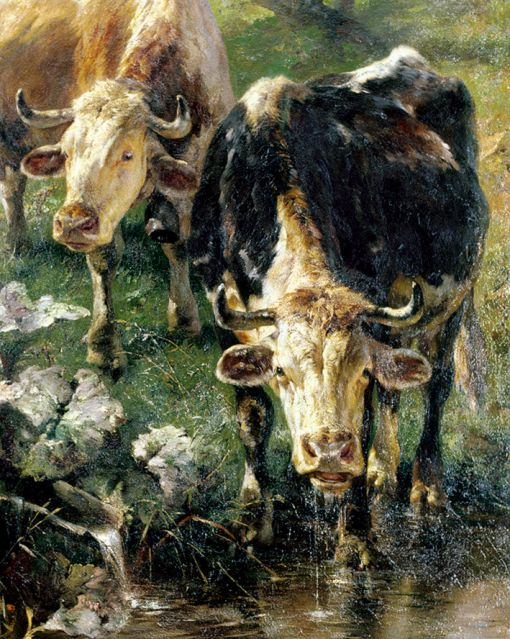
Cows (from his third phase)

Braith was born in Biberach an der Riß. His father was a day-laborer who later became a farm manager. As a child, Braith helped herd the cattle. In 1851, he won a scholarship to attend the Royal Art School in Stuttgart where he studied under Bernhard von Neher and Heinrich von Rustige. Later, in 1860, he and his classmate Albert Kappis moved to Munich, where they made the acquaintance of Christian Mali and became involved in several local "art colonies".

In 1867, he travelled to Paris, together with Kappis and Mali. Several exhibitions there, in Vienna and in Munich were very successful. By 1875, Braith was able to buy a villa in Biberach. He undertook his first trip to Italy in 1884 and returned there in 1889. During the Munich Secession in 1892, Braith remained loyal to the Academy.

He was diagnosed with liver disease in 1903 and, in 1904, went to Bolzano seeking a cure. Six months before his death, he returned to his home town. As he had never married, he left his estate to the city of Biberach, which used part of his legacy to create a museum. His friend Mali died shortly thereafter and also bequeathed his estate to the city. The two are buried side by side in the Old Catholic Cemetery.

The Braith-Mali Museum is now part of an expanded museum complex that also has a large collection of works by Ernst Ludwig Kirchner.

== Work ==
Braith was a member of the Munich School and, after the death of Friedrich Voltz, was considered the greatest painter of animals in Germany. His primary subject was livestock, but he occasionally also painted poultry. He was the first to portray animals in large format, studio pictures. His success as a painter is often attributed to a sense of nostalgia induced by Germany's rapidly industrializing culture.

His work is divided into four phases:

- 1851–1860: Idyllic landscape scenes after the manner of the Dutch.
- 1860–1873: Animals in the context of genre scenes (e.g. with shepherds).
- 1874–1894: Increasingly dramatic portrayals of animals in dynamic situations.
- 1894–1904: Quieter scenes, essentially still-lifes, of animals on pastures.

== Sources ==
- Adam Kuhn: Anton Braith. Ein Bild seines Lebens und Schaffens. Hrsg. vom Kunst- und Altertums-Verein Biberach. Anzeiger vom Oberland GmbH, Biberach an der Riß 1926
- Hans-Peter Bühler: Anton Braith, Christian Mali. Tiermalerei der Münchner Schule. Von Zabern, Mainz 1981, ISBN 3-8053-0534-6
- Die Braith-Mali-Ateliers. Ausstellungsführer. Braith-Mali-Museum, Biberach an der Riß 2000, ISBN 3-933614-03-1
- Uwe Degreif (ed.): Anton Braith. Tiermaler in München. Kunstverlag Josef Fink, Lindenberg im Allgäu 2005, ISBN 3-89870-252-9
