= Christian Mali =

German painter

Christian Friedrich Mali
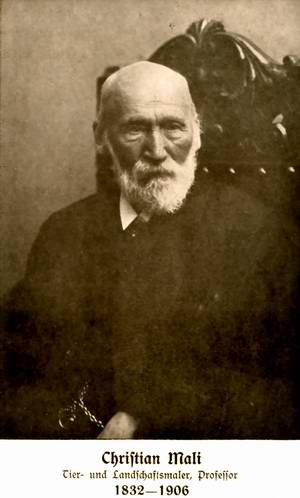
- Born: 6 October 1832; Darthuizen (near Utrecht), Kingdom of the Netherlands
- Died: 1 October 1906 (aged 73); Munich, Kingdom of Bavaria
- Occupations: painter, Art teacher

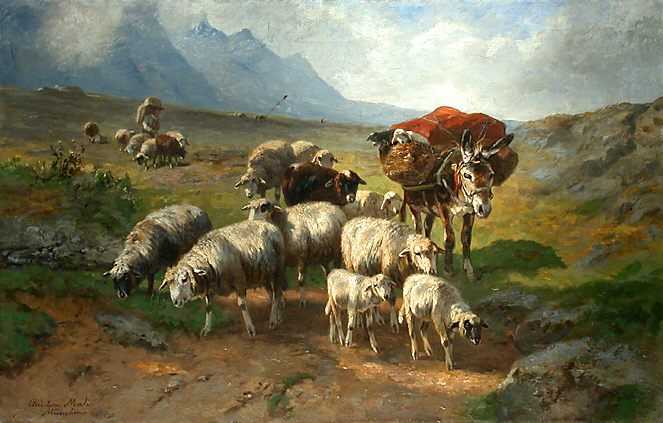
Herd of Sheep with Donkey

Christian Friedrich Mali (6 October 1832, Darthuizen (near Utrecht) – 1 October 1906, Munich) was a German painter and art professor. His older brother, Johannes Cornelis Jacobus Mali (1828–1865) was also a painter.

== Life ==
Mali was the youngest of ten siblings, all of whom displayed artistic talent. After the sudden death of his father in 1833, Mali moved to Württemberg with his mother and worked as a xylographer until 1858. He and his brother Johannes moved to Munich in 1860, where Christian became a lifelong friend of the animal painter Anton Braith.

As the result of a trip to Verona, he became interested in architectural painting, and produced several renderings of the buildings there. In 1865, after the death of his brother, Mali visited Düsseldorf and from there went to Paris, where he encountered the works of the recently deceased animal painter Constant Troyon and, perhaps under the influence of his friend Braith, decided to devote himself to animal painting.

On 14 April 1905, he became an honorary citizen of Biberach an der Riß. Upon his death the following year, he was buried there next to Braith in the Catholic Cemetery. He bequeathed much of his art, his studio and 60,000 Marks to the city of Biberach. The studio (and Braith's) form the core of the Braith-Mali Museum and are among the few fully preserved examples of 19th-century art studios.

== Work ==
His earlier images place more emphasis on scenery and many are set in the Garmisch-Partenkirchen area and the Swabian Jura. His later work focuses almost entirely on dramatic depictions of animals; especially sheep.
