= Gerster =

Gerster is a surname. Notable people with the surname include:

- Andreas Gerster (born 1982), international footballer from Liechtenstein
- Béla Gerster (1850–1923), Hungarian engineer and canal architect
- Etelka Gerster (1855–1920), Hungarian soprano
- Georg Gerster (1928–2019), Swiss journalist and a pioneer aerial photographer
- Frank Gerster (born 1976), former German footballer
- Jan-Ole Gerster (born 1978), German film director
- Martin Gerster (born 1971), German politician
- Petra Gerster (born 1955), German journalist
- Robin Gerster, Australian author and academic

== See also ==
- Gustav Gerster, family-owned textiles company based in Biberach an der Riß, Germany
- Gerster, Missouri, village in St. Clair County, Missouri, United States
