= Sophie Albrecht =

German actress and writer (1756–1840)

Johanne Sophie Dorothea Albrecht
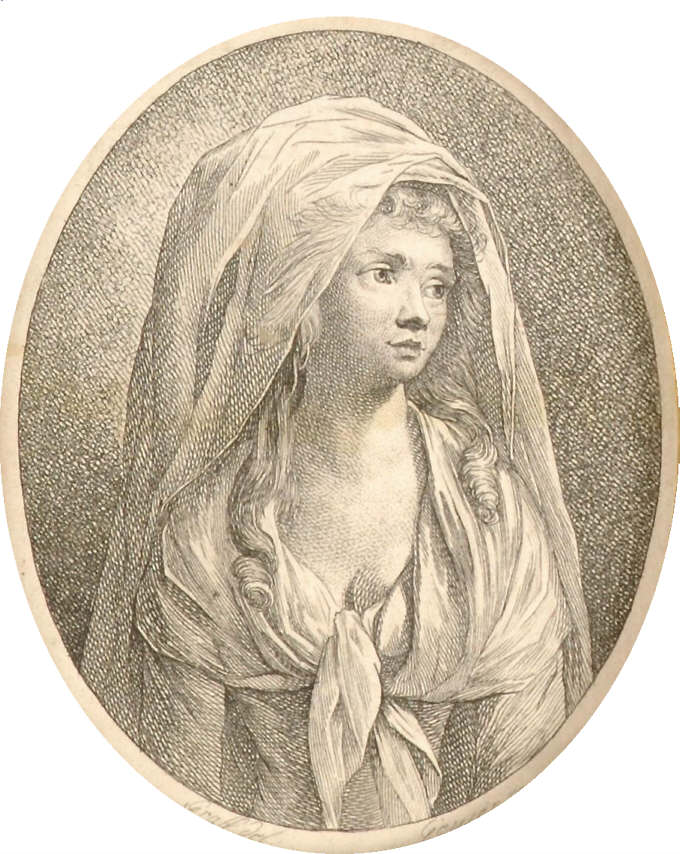
- Born: December 1756; Erfurt
- Died: 16 November 1840 (aged 83); Hamburg
- Occupations: Actress and Writer

Johanne Sophie Dorothea Albrecht (née Baumer; December 1756, Erfurt – 16 November 1840, Hamburg) was a German actress and writer. She played leading roles in plays by Friedrich Schiller, who was a good friend of hers. She wrote poetry, novels, and prose, and was married to the doctor and writer Johann Friedrich Ernst Albrecht.

== Life ==
Sophie Albrecht was born to the Baumer family. Her father was a professor of medicine at University of Erfurt, until he died when Sophie was 14. At age 15, she married Dr. Johann Friedrich Ernst Albrecht, who was one of her father's students. In 1776, Friedrich and Sophie traveled to Reval (now Tallinn, Estonia), where Friedrich was the personal physician of Count Manteuffel. There, Friedrich edited a literary anthology, which included Sophie's first published poems. The Albrechts returned to Erfurt in 1781 due to Sophie's mother's failing health. Her mother died the next year. In Erfurt at age 25, Sophie published her first book of poetry and started acting.

== Actress ==
Albrecht's first performance as an actress was in an amateur production of Christian Felix Weiße's Romeo and Juliet with great success in her hometown of Erfurt. Her debut as a professional actress happened in 1782, with the Grossmann troupe. The troupe did performances in Frankfurt and Mainz. A year later, she met Friedrich Schiller and played Luise Miller in his first performance of Kabale und Liebe. Sophie Albrecht and Friedrich Schiller had similar interests and became close friends.

In 1786, Albrecht joined the Bondini troupe at Dresden Court Theater. In 1787, she traveled to Leipzig to act in the Leipzig premier of Schiller's Don Carlos, where she played Princess Eboli. The following year, Albrecht traveled to a small court theater in Schwerin, where her performance often consisted of acting like a naive girl. Later, she traveled to Prague, Mannheim and eventually Hamburg to be a guest performer at the Theater am Gänsemarkt.

In 1796, Albrecht and her husband, now a popular playwright, managed the National Theater in Altona (at that time part of the Kingdom of Denmark). Sophie commemorated the event with her Antrittsrede bei Eröffnung des Nationaltheaters (Welcoming Address at the Opening of the National Theater) on September 1, 1796. A year later, Albrecht quit the Altonaer Nationaltheater and divorced her husband.

== Works ==
=== Poetry ===
In Reval, Albrecht's poems were first published in a literary anthology edited by her husband. Although Sophie never did find popularity among male literary establishments, she did have a strong network of women on whom she relied to write about female relations. Her works drew attention to the importance of female friends in her life. Sophie dedicated her first two volumes of poetry (1781; 1785) to women friends. She wrote a love poem for fellow actress, Catharina Felicitas Abt, whom Albrecht never met and who had recently died. The poem was entitled An dem Grabe der Madame Abt in Göttingen den 19ten August 1784 (At the grave of Madame Abt in Göttingen the 19th of August 1784).

Sophie Albrecht wrote about love, but not in its tranquility. Ruth P. Dawson describes Sophie saying, "Sophie Albrecht glorified love but could find no way to embed it in positive social narratives, connecting it instead directly and indirectly with death, and particularly, suicide". Her work is often described as melancholy with sorrow or regret as underlying themes. Another analysis of Sophie Albrecht's works by Mary Helen Dupree explains: "she channels her experience of loss and death into opportunities for self-exploration, resistance to social norms, and artistic productivity." However, by 1792 Sophie Albrecht had stopped writing poetry.

=== Prose ===
Later in life Sophie a wrote Gothic horror novel about ghosts and mystery. Albrecht's novel, Das höfliche Gespenst (The Polite Ghost), was published on three separate occasions under three different names — Legenden (Legends) (1797), Das höfliche Gespenst (The Polite Ghost), and Ida von Duba, das Mädchen im Walde; eine romantische Geschichte aus den grauenvollen Tagen der Vorwelt (Ida von Duba, the Girl in the Forest; a Romantic Story from the Dreadful Days of the Past) (1805). The Polite Ghost told a story about what happens after the war ends and the hero is dead, leaving behind a widow, who is haunted by a ghost. The nature of the relationship between the two characters — Ida and Katharine — has led many to believe the text is in part about same-sex attraction.

In 1808, Albrecht published Romantische Dichtungen aus der ältern christlichen Kirche (Romantic Literature from the Early Christian Church); unlike The Polite Ghost, it did not display Gothic themes.

== Later life ==
Albrecht used writing as a source of income after her divorce, although her ex-husband did help sustain her until his death from typhus in 1814. She spent the next quarter century in poverty, and at the age of 80 had begun writing cookbooks to earn money. Sophie Albrecht died at the age of 82. In 1841 a friend published a collection of Albrecht's poems to pay for a gravestone.

Sophie Albrecht was the first eighteenth-century German woman poet to have her works published during her lifetime.

== Selected works ==
From An Encyclopedia of Continental Women Writers

- Ehstländische Blumenlese für das Jahr 1779 [Estonian Anthology for the Year 1779] Sophie contributed several poems (1779)
- Gedichte und Schauspiele. [Poems and Plays] 1781
- Aramena; eine syrische Geschichte, ganz für unsre Zeiten umbearbeite, after a novel by Anton Ulrich Duke of Braunschweig, 3 parts (1783–1787)
- Gedichte und prosaische Aufsätze, 2. Th. [Poems and Prose Essays, Part Two] (1785)
- Gedichte und prosaische Aufsätze, 3. Th. [Poems and Prose Essays, Part Three] 1791
- Antrittsrede bei Eröffnunng des Nationaltheaters in Altona am 1. Sept. 1796 [Welcoming Address at the Opening of the National Theater in Altona on 1 Sept. 1796] (1796)
- Legenden [Legends] (1797; also under the title Das höfliche Gespenst [The Polite Ghost]
- Graumännchen, oder die Burg Rabenbuhl; eine Geistergeschichte [Graumännchen, or Castle Rabenbuhl; a Ghost Story] (1799)
- Legenden aus den Zeiten der Wunder und Erscheinungen [Legends from the Times of Miracles and Apparitions] (1800) With J.F.E. Albrecht
- Erzählungen [Tales] (1801)
- Der Kummer verschmähter Liebe; als Declamationsstück m. musikalischer Begleitung des Claviers oder Fortepianos bearbeitet [The Pain of Reject Love; for Declamation with Musical Accompaniment on the Piano or Fortepiano] (1801)
- Ida von Duba, das Mädchen im Walde; eine romantische Geschichte aus den grauenvollen Tagen der Vorwelt [Ida von Duba, the Girl in the Forest; a Romantic Story from the Dreadful Days of the Past] (1805)
- Romantische Dichtungen aus der ältern christ lichen Kirche [Romantic Literature from the Early Christian Church] (1808)
- Erfurter Kochbuch für die bürgerliche Küche [Thuringian Cookbook from the Bourgeois Kitchen] (1839)
- Anthologie aus den Poesien von Sophie Albrecht, erwählt und herausgegeben von Fr. Clemens (1841)

== Sources ==
- Royer, Berit C. R. (1999). Sophie Albrecht (1757-1840) im Kreis der Schriftstellerinnen um 1800: eine literatur- und kulturwissenschaftliche Werk-Monographie. Ann Arbor, Michigan: UMI Dissertation.
- Dupree, Mary Helen. (2011). The Mask and the Quill. Lewisburg: Bucknell University Press.
- Royer, Berit C. R. (2015). Sophie Albrecht, ein künstlerisches Phänomen in Literatur und Theater des 18. Jahrhunderts. Gender, Rezeption und die Arbeitsgemeinschaft mit ihrem Ehemann. - Schütt, Rüdiger (ed.): Verehrt, verflucht, vergessen: Leben und Werk von Sophie Albrecht und Johann Friedrich Ernst Albrecht. Hannover, Germany: Wehrhahn. pp. 313–352. ISBN 978-3-86525-447-4.
- Royer, Berit C. R. (2018). Beating the Odds: Sophie Albrecht (1756–1840), a Successful Woman Writer and Publisher in Eighteenth-Century Germany. - Carme Font Paz and Nina Geerdink (eds.): Economic Imperatives for Women's Writing in Early Modern Europe. Leiden and Boston: Brill / Rodopi. pp. 221–256. ISBN 978-90-04-38299-2.
