= Volksfest =

Type of event in German-speaking countries

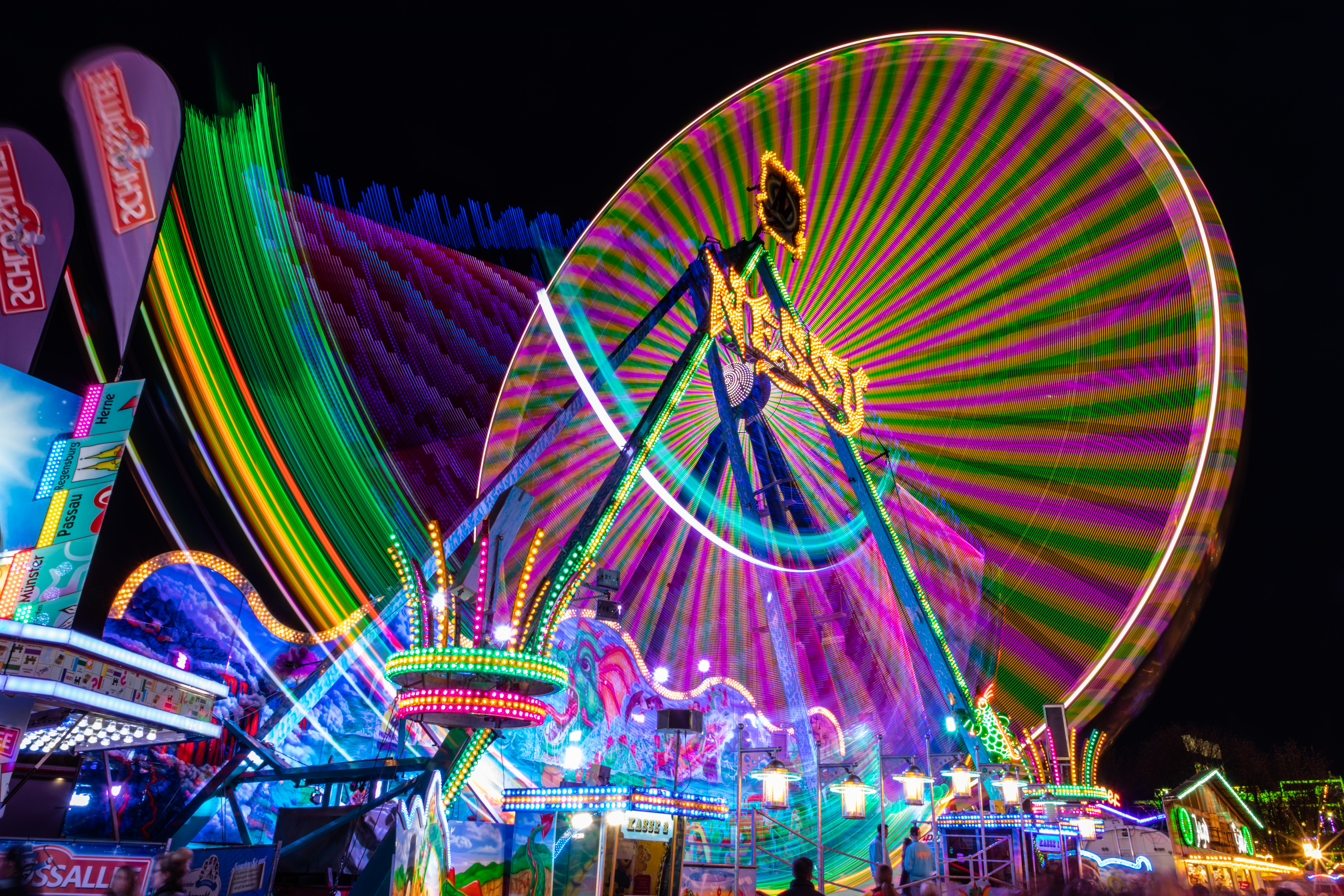
Illuminated Ferris wheel and fairground rides at a Volksfest in Münster, North Rhine-Westphalia, Germany.

A Volksfest (pronounced [ˈfɔlks.fɛst]; German for "people's festival") (Note: Cognate of "folk festival" in English) is a large event in German-speaking countries which usually combines a beer festival or wine festival and a travelling funfair. Attractions may include amusement rides, games of chance and skill, and food and merchandise vendors.

When there is a beer festival, it is common to build one or more beer tents (Festzelte), usually sponsored by a brewery, and set up beer gardens where it is possible to order traditional food and try the Festbier (beer specially brewed for the season). A large beer tent will have hundreds of wooden benches with a seating capacity in the thousands and offer live music, being a favourite place for patrons to spend the evening. Oktoberfest is the world's biggest Volksfest and occurs yearly in Munich, Bavaria.

== Admission ==
Admission to a Volksfest and the beer tents is free. However, rides or games are paid for separately. In contrast to traveling carnivals in the US, each Volksfest ride is independently run, so tickets for several rides are uncommon. Inside the beer tents, there are usually tables that can be reserved, while the rest are on a first-come, first-served basis.

== Duration and location ==
There is at least one Volksfest in many of the larger towns in Germany every year, each lasting from one to three weeks. In some towns there are two or more per year. A Volkfest is local in nature, attended mostly by people original from the hosting town and surrounding areas, but it may also attract international tourists. Sindelfingen is the only town to have given up its Volksfest.

A Volksfest takes place nearly at the same date every year. A number of these have a long tradition and feature a variety of events like parades in historical costumes or traditional shooting competitions. One of the oldest Volksfests in Germany is the Lullusfest in Bad Hersfeld. A Volksfest usually takes place in a special location. Some of these sites are well known such as the Cannstatter Wasen in Stuttgart and Theresienwiese in Munich; however there are some Volksfest events which take place partly in the streets of towns.

As the Volkfest is temporary in nature, most mechanical attractions, games and beer tents are assembled in the weeks or months prior to the start of the festival, and dismantled once it is over.

== Impact and demographics ==
=== Visitor demographics ===
Annual attendance across all German Volksfests reached a historic peak of 198.4 million visits in 2023, comprising 188.4 million domestic and roughly 10 million international visitors.

The festivals serve as significant community gatherings, with over 90% of visitors attending in the company of others. The average group size is five people and 29% of attendees visit with children, whose average age is nine.

=== Economic impact ===
As of 2023, Germany's 9,750 Volksfests generate an annual gross revenue of €6.5 billion. These events serve as a major employment driver, supporting 57,160 full-time employees, which includes around 30,800 direct employees within the travelling showmen businesses.

According to a 2023 industry study, visitors to large-scale public festivals spent the highest amount, averaging €45.80 per person. In contrast, spending at medium-sized festivals averaged €32.90 per person. The lowest daily expenditure occurred at small festivals, where visitors spent approximately €24.20 per person.

=== Environmental impact ===
Modern Volksfests have increasingly adopted environmentally friendly practices to reduce their carbon footprint. Over half of host municipalities now operate their festivals predominantly utilising green electricity. Furthermore with the average distance to a public transit stop being just 600 metres (2,000 ft), only slightly more than half of the visitors use a car during their visit to a festival.

Major events like the Oktoberfest have implemented further measures, including operating on green electricity and eco-friendly natural gas, offsetting CO_{2} emissions through the purchase of reduction certificates, banning disposable tableware and utilising greywater recycling systems.

== Clothing ==
Especially in Bavaria, it is common during the Volksfest for people to wear the Tracht or traditional outfits such as Lederhosen and white or chequered shirts for men, and the Dirndl for women.

== Well-known events ==
Major Volksfest events in Germany

Event	Location	State	Notes
Augsburger Plärrer	Augsburg	Bavaria	
Bad Kreuznacher Jahrmarkt	Bad Kreuznach	Rhineland-Palatinate	
Barthelmarkt	Oberstimm (near Ingolstadt)	Bavaria	
Baumblütenfest	Werder	Brandenburg	
Bergkirchweih	Erlangen	Bavaria	
Biberacher Schützenfest	Biberach an der Riss	Baden-Württemberg	
Bremer Freimarkt	Bremen	Bremen	
Cannstatter Volksfest	Stuttgart	Baden-Württemberg	The (4th) largest Volksfest in the world (after Oktoberfest Munich, Cranger Kirmes in Herne, and Rheinkirmes in Düsseldorf)
Cranger Kirmes	Herne	North Rhine-Westphalia	A Kirmes was originally the anniversary of the dedication of the local church
Frankfurter Dippemess	Frankfurt	Hesse	the largest and oldest Frankfurt Volksfest
Rheinkirmes	Düsseldorf	North Rhine-Westphalia	
Gäubodenvolksfest	Straubing	Bavaria	
Gillamoos	Abensberg	Bavaria	
Hamburger Dom	Hamburg	Hamburg	
Kiel Week	Kiel	Schleswig-Holstein	
Museum Embankment Festival	Frankfurt	Hesse	annually more than 3 million visitors
Nuremberg Spring Festival	Nuremberg	Bavaria	
Nuremberg Fall Festival	Nuremberg	Bavaria	
Kinderzeche	Dinkelsbühl	Bavaria	
Kramermarkt	Oldenburg	Lower Saxony	
Maschseefest	Hanover	Lower Saxony	
Oktoberfest	Munich	Bavaria	The largest beer-centered festival in the world; anniversary of the 1810 wedding of Crown Prince Ludwig and Princess Therese
Oktoberfest Hannover	Hanover	Lower Saxony	Established in 1964
Rutenfest	Ravensburg	Baden-Württemberg	
Schützenfest	Hanover	Lower Saxony	The largest rifle club funfair in the world
Schweinfurt Volksfest	Schweinfurt	Bavaria	Established in 1909
Wäldchestag	Frankfurt	Hesse	
Wurstmarkt	Bad Dürkheim	Rhineland-Palatinate	

== Bibliography ==
- Rast, Christian; Melzer, Lukas (25 March 2024). "Die wirtschaftliche Bedeutung der Volksfeste in Deutschland 2023" [The Economic Impact of Volksfests in Germany 2023] (PDF) (in German). Deutscher Schaustellerbund e.V.
