= Wieland-Gymnasium Biberach =

Coordinates: 48°05′48.50″N 9°47′35.31″E

The Wieland-Gymnasium is one of two Gymnasien (high schools) in Biberach an der Riß, Baden-Württemberg, Germany (along with Pestalozzi-Gymnasium). It is named after the poet Christoph Martin Wieland, who lived and worked in Biberach. The school is popular for introducing the Biberacher Modell, a model in which pupils begin to learn Latin at an early age, which has been adopted by many schools in Baden-Württemberg. At the moment (May 2008) the school counts 1029 pupils and 80 teachers. Since 2006, some new buildings, including a cafeteria, have been built on the school grounds to make the school ready for full-time classes.

== History ==
- In 1278, a Latin school in Biberach was documented for the first time.
- In 1775, Thaddäus Plazzary founds a “Professoratsschule” (professorial school).
- Since 1928, pupils can make Abitur exams at the “Progymnasium und Oberrealschule mit städtischen Oberklassen”.
- In 1937, the school is renamed to “Horst-Wessel-Oberschule für Jungen” (Horst Wessel grammar school for boys) under the Nazi regime.
- In 1961, the school moves to a new building and in 1962 it is renamed to “Wieland-Gymnasium”.

== Education ==
The lower classes have already adapted the G8 (8-year education system), whereas the higher grades still use the G9.

Pupils can choose to have Latin or additional arts lessons. In the 8th grade, either the natural scientific or the linguistic (introducing Spanish) profile can be chosen. Furthermore, the school is one of the first in Baden-Württemberg to teach economy in higher grades.
