= Schweinfurt Volksfest =

Annual festival in Schweinfurt, Germany

Schweinfurt Volksfest Schweinfurter Volksfest
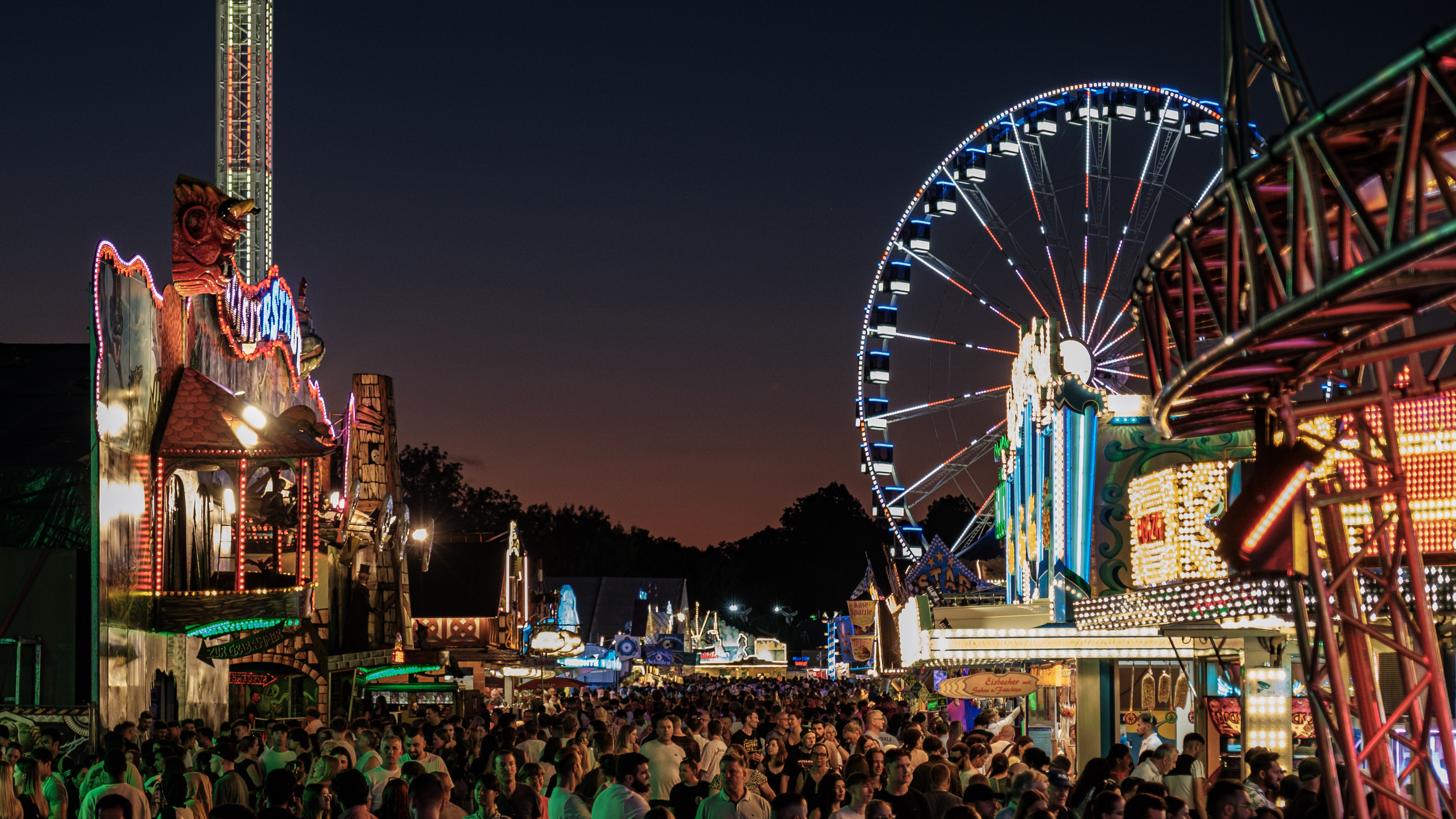
- Schweinfurt Volksfest 2025 after sunset
- Status: Active
- Genre: Volksfest (folk festival)
- Begins: June 5, 2026
- Ends: June 14, 2026
- Frequency: Annually
- Locations: Volksfestplatz, Niederwerrner Straße, Schweinfurt, Bavaria, Germany
- Coordinates: 50°2′53″N 10°12′7″E
- Country: Germany
- Years active: 1909–present (with wartime interruptions)
- Founder: Verein zur Hebung und Förderung des Fremdenverkehrs
- Organiser: City of Schweinfurt, Department of Public Order
- Website: volksfest-schweinfurt.de

The Schweinfurt Volksfest is an annual Volksfest (beer festival and travelling funfair) in Schweinfurt, Lower Franconia in Bavaria, Germany. Established in 1909, the festival runs for about 10 days each year and is a significant cultural event in the region. In 2026 the event is held from 5 June to 14 June.

== History ==
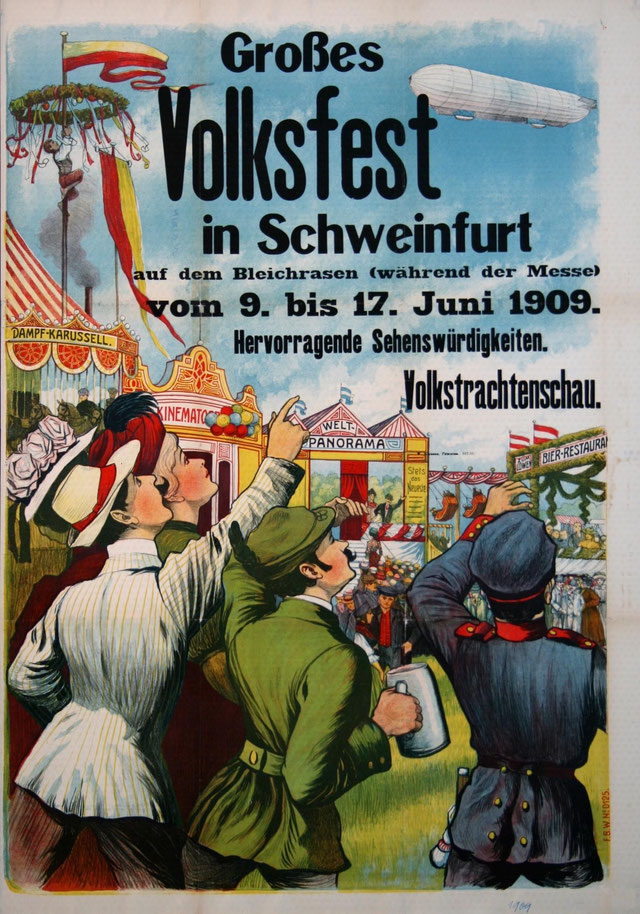
Schweinfurt Volksfest 1909 poster

The first event took place in 1909 and marked the beginning of the city’s Volksfest tradition. At time Schweinfurt experienced rapid growth and the city administration looked for ways to make the city more attractive and promote tourism. An idea emerged to organise a large public festival on the western part of the Maininsel (an island on the river Main), in the area historically known as the "Bleichrasen".

The event was inspired by earlier traditions such as the Vogelschießen (bird shooting) festival, which had been held since 1787.

The inaugural Volksfest began on 9 June 1909 with a parade to the festival grounds through Bauerngasse led by festival host Baron Muckl followed by beer wagons from the Christian Wagner brewery.

The Bleichrasen was transformed into a lively festival ground, featuring attractions such as a cinematograph (early cinema), carousel, maze and a toboggan slide. There were also food stalls and a dance platform with a maypole.

A main attraction was the massive beer hall that could accommodate 5000 people. A Maß (1 liter) of beer cost 30 Pfennig (approximately €1.95 when adjusted for inflation).

On 17 June 1909 the festival ended with a large fireworks display. The Volksfest quickly became a significant annual event, laying the foundation for Schweinfurt’s long-standing tradition of public festivals.

== Cultural significance ==
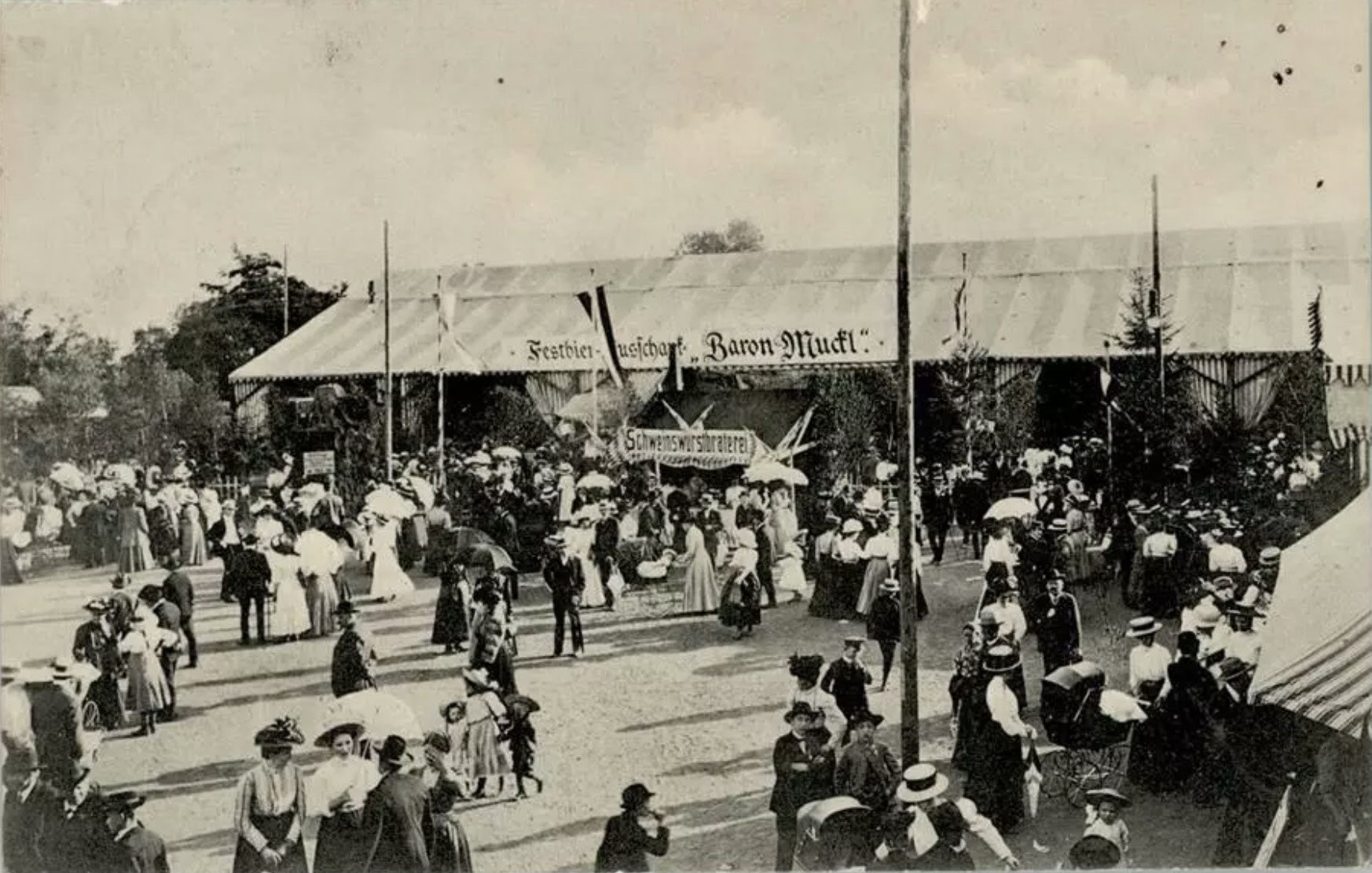
Volksfest tent at the turn of the 20th century

Folk festivals in Bavaria hold significant cultural importance as traditional events deeply rooted in local history and community life. They serve as inclusive celebrations meant for everyone, offering a space for families, friends and neighbours to socialise together and contribute significantly to the local economy. Schweinfurt Volksfest has been celebrated since the beginning of the 20th century making it a longstanding tradition that brings generations of people together. Its endurance highlights its role as a key annual event in the region’s cultural calendar. It usually takes place two weeks beginning Friday after Corpus Christi.

The event showcases Franconian culinary traditions, with regional specialties and beer brewed by local breweries served in beer tents and beer gardens, supporting local producers.

The festival’s survival through two world wars and social changes demonstrates its deep cultural significance to the Schweinfurt community.

== Highlights ==
=== Opening ceremony ===
In 2025 Sebastian Remelé as mayor Oberbürgermeister (German) of the city of Schweinfurt, opened the Schweinfurt Volksfest on 20 June. This was his final time performing this ceremonial duty as mayor of Schweinfurt. In 2026 the opening ceremony will be performed by Ralf Hofmann as the newly elected mayor, opening the festival on 5 June 2026.

=== Parade ===
A parade is one of the oldest traditions of the festival. An annual procession was held through the city centre to the then-festival site at the Bleichrasen from 1909 until 1968. The tradition stopped for several decades before being revived by the city to mark the 100th anniversary in 2009, when over 20,000 spectators lined the streets as the procession made its way from the market square to the Volksfestplatz. Following the success of the parade the city council has decided to establish it as a recurring fixture of the festival programme. Subsequent processions were held in 2014 and 2018, the latter comprising approximately 1,200 participants across 49 groups. The 2024 parade was cancelled due to the adverse weather.

=== Rides ===
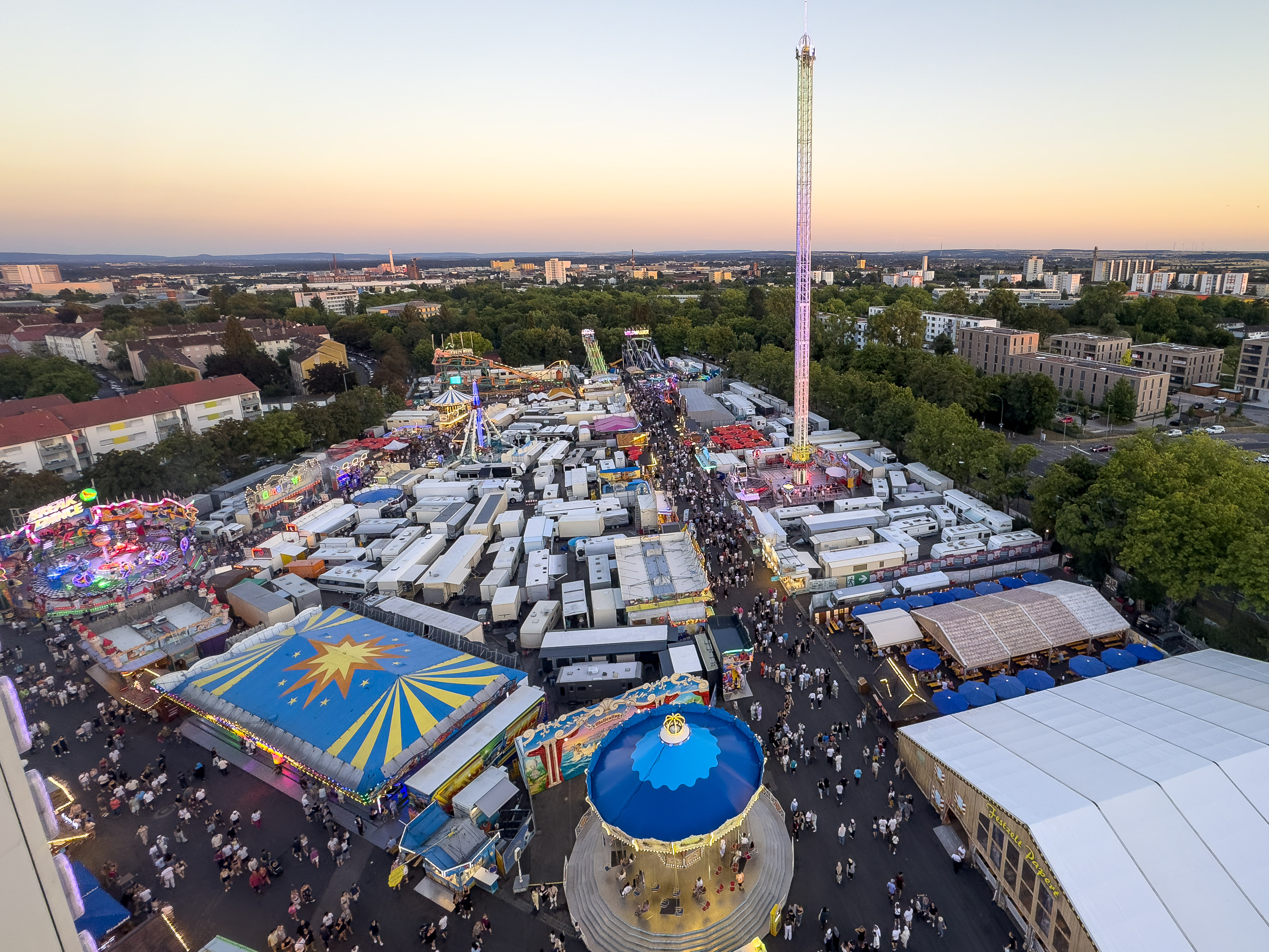
View of Schweinfurt Volksfest 2025 festival grounds from the Ferris wheel

Schweinfurt Volksfest features a diverse selection of rides catering to visitors of all ages. The event features high-adrenaline rides such as a drop tower and roller coasters, alongside classic fairground favourites like bumper cars, swing rides and a large Ferris wheel.

Major rides at the Schweinfurt Volksfest
Image	Name	Type	Description	Years present
	Autoskooter	Bumper cars	Classic bumper cars, featuring new vehicles in 2025.	2025-2026
	Avenger	Thrill ride	Hydraulic gondola ride with side-by-side seating. The ride was refurbished and modernised in 2025.	2026
	Beach Walking	Walkable water balls	Hollow spheres on water.	2025-2026
	Break Dance	Breakdance	Classic spinning ride with rotating seats.	2025
	Booster	Thrill ride	High‑gravity carousel with gondolas rotating by up to 50°.	2026
	Crazy Mine	Spinning Coaster	Fully themed spinning coaster, 430 metres (1,410 ft) of track, 17 metres (56 ft) height difference, the first time in Schweinfurt.	2025
	Evergreen	Jumping horse carousel	One of the largest nostalgic carousels in Germany.	2025-2026
	Evolution	Thrill ride	High flying carousel with two rotating arms and flipping gondolas, taking riders up to 66 metres (217 ft) high at up to 140 kilometres per hour (87 mph), including upside-down flight.	2026
	Flip Fly	Inversion Ride	Popular ride featuring full inversion.	2025
	Geisterstadt	Ghost Train (Haunted House)	Two-story horror ride with moving figures and effects.	2025
	Geisterbahn Halloween	Ghost Train (Haunted House)	Halloween-themed ghost train with moving figures, effects and over 300 metres (980 ft) of track.	2026
	Glaswerk	Glass & Mirror Maze	Maze of mirrors and glass panels.	2025
	High Explosive	Spinning Coaster	Family adventure coaster with three‑seater cars, running through steep curves past a lake with a fountain. The ride was equipped with a new interactive station area in 2024.	2026
	Jim & Jasper's Wild Wasser	Log flume	Largest mobile log flume ride in Europe, completely re-themed in 2022, with two drops up to 16 metres (52 ft) and a nearly 400 metres (1,300 ft) course.	2026
	Kinder-traum-schleife	Amusement ride	A child ride featuring miniature vehicles that travel on a circular track.	
	Mike's Pit Stop	Fun house	Workshop-themed walkthrough with sound and water effects.	2025
	Piraten Jumping	Children's trampoline	Trampoline jumping for kids.	2025-2026
	Predator	Thrill ride	Rotating inverting gondola ride for thrill-seekers.	2025
	Riesenrad	Ferris wheel	Large wheel offering a bird's-eye view of Schweinfurt and the festival grounds.	2025
	Skyfall	Drop tower	80 metres (260 ft) tall free fall tower offering panoramic views and a thrill drop.	2025
	Star Ralley	Bumper cars	Child-friendly bumper car ride.	2025
	Wellenflieger	Swing ride	Traditional swing carousel.	2025
	Wildwasser	Log flume	Classic water ride suitable for families.	2025
	Zauberschloss	Children's ride	Fairytale-themed ride for kids.	2025-2026

=== Fireworks ===
The Volksfest traditionally features fireworks displays on both opening and closing nights of the festival. In 2026 these displays are scheduled at 22:30, with the opening and closing fireworks in 2026 falling on 5 June and 14 June respectively.

== Facts and data ==
=== Beer prices ===
Maß (1 liter) of beer prices at Schweinfurt Volksfest over the years.

Mass beer prices at Schweinfurt Volksfest
Year	Price	Price adjusted for inflation
2026	€11.90	
2025	€11.80	
2024	€11.30	
2023	€10.80	
2008	€5.80	Approximately equivalent to €8 in 2023
2002-2006	€5.30	Approximately equivalent to €8 in 2023
1999	DM 8.9	Approximately equivalent to €3.22 in 2021
1976	DM 3.2	Approximately equivalent to €2.26 in 2021
1909	30 Pfennig	Approximately €1.95 in 2025

== Social initiatives ==
Since 2025 the Volksfest has offered a safe space for girls and women who feel unsafe or experienced harassment on the festival grounds. The scheme is organised by the local association Frauen helfen Frauen (lit. 'Women Help Women'), run by both employees and volunteers. This follows a similar initiative at the Oktoberfest that existed since 2003.

The safe space is located behind the Ferris wheel and operates on the weekends and the Ladies Night from 19:00. Support teams are also available throughout the grounds and can be identified by their purple vests.
