= Felicitas Abt =

German actress (1741 - 1783)

Felicitas Katharina Abt (December 18, 1741 – September 16, 1783) was a German actress.

== Life ==
Felicitas Abt was born in Biberach an der Riß to the Surgeon Johann Adam Knecht (1710–1775) and his wife Benigna Friederike (née Dinglinger); she had two brothers and a sister. Her uncles were the composer Justin Heinrich Knecht and the poet Christoph Martin Wieland.

Together with her siblings she performed at the theater in Biberach and there met the actor Karl Friedrich Abt, who had been performing in the comedians' company at the Comedy House since 1762 under the direction of her uncle Christoph Martin Wieland.
