= Justin Heinrich Knecht =

German composer, organist and music theorist

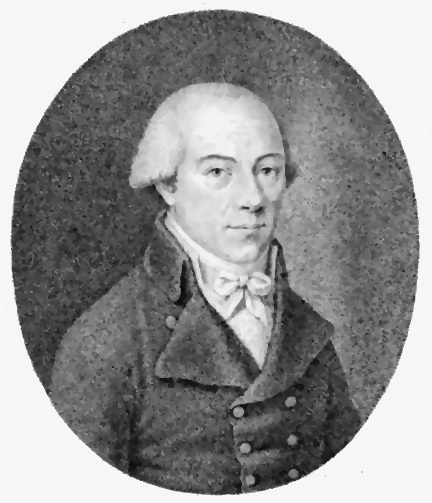
Justin Heinrich Knecht

Justinus or Justin Heinrich Knecht (30 September 1752 – 1 December 1817) was a German composer, organist, and music theorist.

== Biography ==
He was born in Biberach an der Riss, where he learnt to play the organ, keyboard, violin, and singing. He attended a Lutheran collegiate institution in Esslingen am Neckar from 1768 to 1771, when he became Lutheran preceptor and music director in Biberach, which was a free imperial city until 1803, and had a rich cultural life. He became organist of St Martin's church in 1792, which was used simultaneously by Lutherans and Catholics.

He led an energetic, busy musical life; he composed for the theatre and church, organised subscription concerts, and taught music theory, acoustics, aesthetics, composition, and instruments at the Gymnasium, which was affiliated to the Musikschule in 1806. He went to Stuttgart in December 1806 in the hopes of a post there as Kapellmeister or similar, but after being appointed Direktor beim Orchester by the King of Württemberg in April 1807, he returned in 1808 to his former life in Biberach where he remained for the rest of his life.

== Works ==
Collections are in the Wieland-Archiv, Biberach, and the Kick collection at the library of University of Tübingen. A full thematic catalogue is in Ladenburger (1984).

=== Vocal ===
- Psalm XXIII (Leipzig, 1783)
- Psalm VI (Speyer, 1788)
- Magnificat (1790–1791)
- Psalm I (Speyer, 1792)
- Herr Gott, dich loben wir (Stuttgart, 1816), on Luther's "Herr Gott, dich loben wir"
- Vollständige Sammlung ... vierstimmiger Choralmelodien für das neue wirtembergische Landesgesangbuch, ed. Knecht and J.F. Christmann (Stuttgart, 1799)
- Dixit Dominus (1800)
- 10 cantatas (c. 1800)
- Te Deum (Offenbach, 1801)
- Wechselgesang der Mirjam und Debora (F.G. Klopstock: Der Messias) (Leipzig, 1781)
- The tune Kocher set in English to the hymn 'O happy band of pilgrims' (Hymns Ancient & Modern New Standard #208).

=== Opera and stage ===
- Die treuen Köhler (operetta, G.E. Heermann), 1786
- Jupiter und Ganymed (prologue and epilogue), 1783
- Die Entführung aus dem Serail (comic opera, C.F. Bretzner), 1787
- Der lahme Husar (comic opera, F. Koch), 1788
- Der Schulz im Dorfe, oder der verliebte Herr Doctor (comic opera, C.L. Dieter), 1789
- Der Kohlenbrenner (Lustspiel mit Gesang, L. Ysenburg von Buri), 1789
- Der Musenchor (prologue, Knecht), 1791
- Die Glocke (melodrama, F. Schiller), 1807
- Die Aeolsharfe, oder Der Triumph der Musik und Liebe (romantic opera, N. Remmele), 1807–1808
- Feodore (singspiel, A. von Kotzebue), 1812
- Ubaldo (incidental music, Kotzebue), 1818

=== Orchestral ===
- Le portrait musical de la nature, ou Grande sinfonie (Pastoralsymphonie) (Speyer, 1784–1785), modern edition by H.W. Höhnen in The Symphony 1720–1840, series C, XIII (New York, 1984) - this work was much admired and anticipates the programme of Beethoven's Pastoral Symphony

=== Chamber ===
- Sonata, for harpsichord, violin and cello ad libitum (Speyer, 1790)
- 3 Duos, for 2 flutes (Speyer, 1791)
- Diverses danses, for piano/(flute and guitar) (Mainz, 1817)

=== Organ ===
- Neue vollständige Sammlung ... für ... Klavier- und Orgelspieler (Speyer 1791–1795)
- Die durch ein Donnerwetter unterbrochne Hirtenwonne (Darmstadt, 1794), modern edition by H.W. Höhnen (Wiesbaden, 1982)
- 90 kurze und leichte neue Orgelstücke (Augsburg, 1794)
- Vollständige Orgelschule (Leipzig, 1795–1798/1989) - Ludwig van Beethoven owned a copy of this work
- Sammlung progressiver Orgelstücke (Biberach, 1805)
- Königlich württembergisches ... Choralbuch (Stuttgart, 1816)
- Caecilia (Freiburg, 1817–19)

He completed J. S. Bach's The Art of Fugue (1803), but this has been lost.

=== Piano ===
- 12 variationen (Leipzig, 1785)
- Kleine praktische Klavierschule (Munich, 1799–1802)
- Kleine theoretische Klavierschule (Munich, 1800–1801)
- Bewährtes Methodenbuch beim ersten Klavierunterricht (Freiburg, 1820)

=== Theoretical ===
In music theory, he agreed with the ideas of G.J. Vogler.

- Erklärung einiger … missverstandenen Grundsätze aus der Voglerschen Theorie (Ulm, 1785)
- Gemeinnützliches Elementarwerk der Harmonie und des Generalbasses, part 1 (Speyer, 1792), parts 2–4 (Stuttgart, 1793–1797)
- Kleines alphabetisches Wörterbuch der vornehmsten und interessantesten Artikel aus der musikalischen Theorie (Ulm, 1795)
- Knechts allgemeiner musikalischer Katechismus (Biberach, 1803)
- Luthers Verdienste um Musik und Poesie (Ulm, 1817)
- Theoretisch-praktische Generalbassschule (Freiburg, c.1817)

== Selected Recordings ==
- Die Äolsharfe dir. Frieder Bernius.
- Le portrait musical de la nature, ou Grande sinfonie dir. Frieder Bernius.
- Le Portrait Musical de la Nature, dir. Bernhard Forck Akademie für Alte Musik Berlin.

== Sources ==
- Michael Ladenburger: 'Knecht, Justin Heinrich', Grove Music Online ed. L. Macy (Accessed 2007-06-13), http://www.grovemusic.com/
