= Rutenfest Ravensburg =

Festival in Ravensburg, Germany

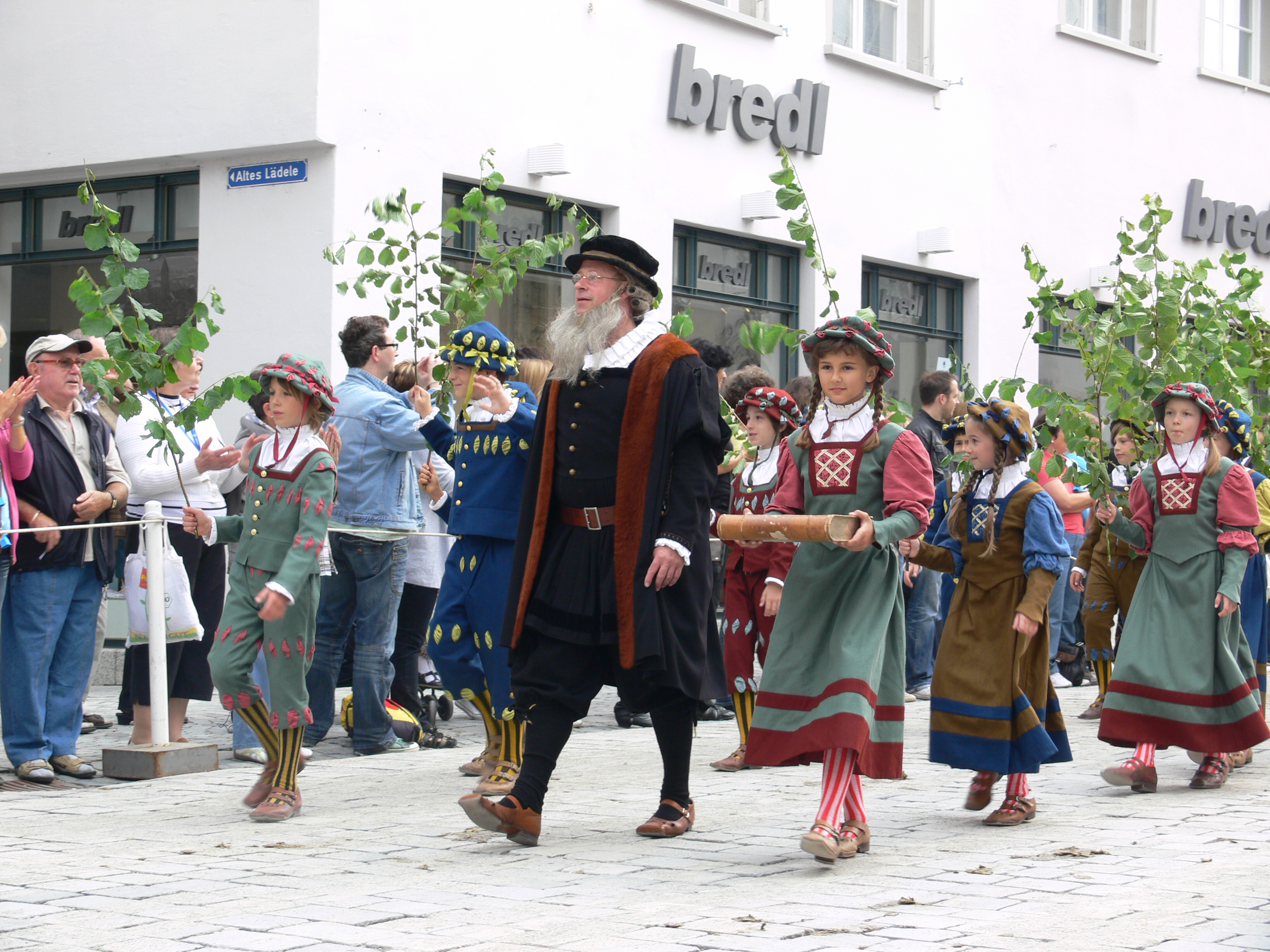
Rutenkinder (birch children) lead the historical parade on Ruten Monday.

Rutenfest (literally birch whip festival) is an annual town festival in Ravensburg, Upper Swabia, Germany. At the end of the school term (usually in July), local pupils and adult citizens take part in many Rutenfest events including a parade watched by tens of thousands of spectators. Rutenfest is generally considered the high spot of Ravensburg's city life. Alumni of local schools flock back to their hometown, to meet family and friends at the events officially organized by the Rutenfest Commission, and at hundreds of private parties.

== Etymology ==
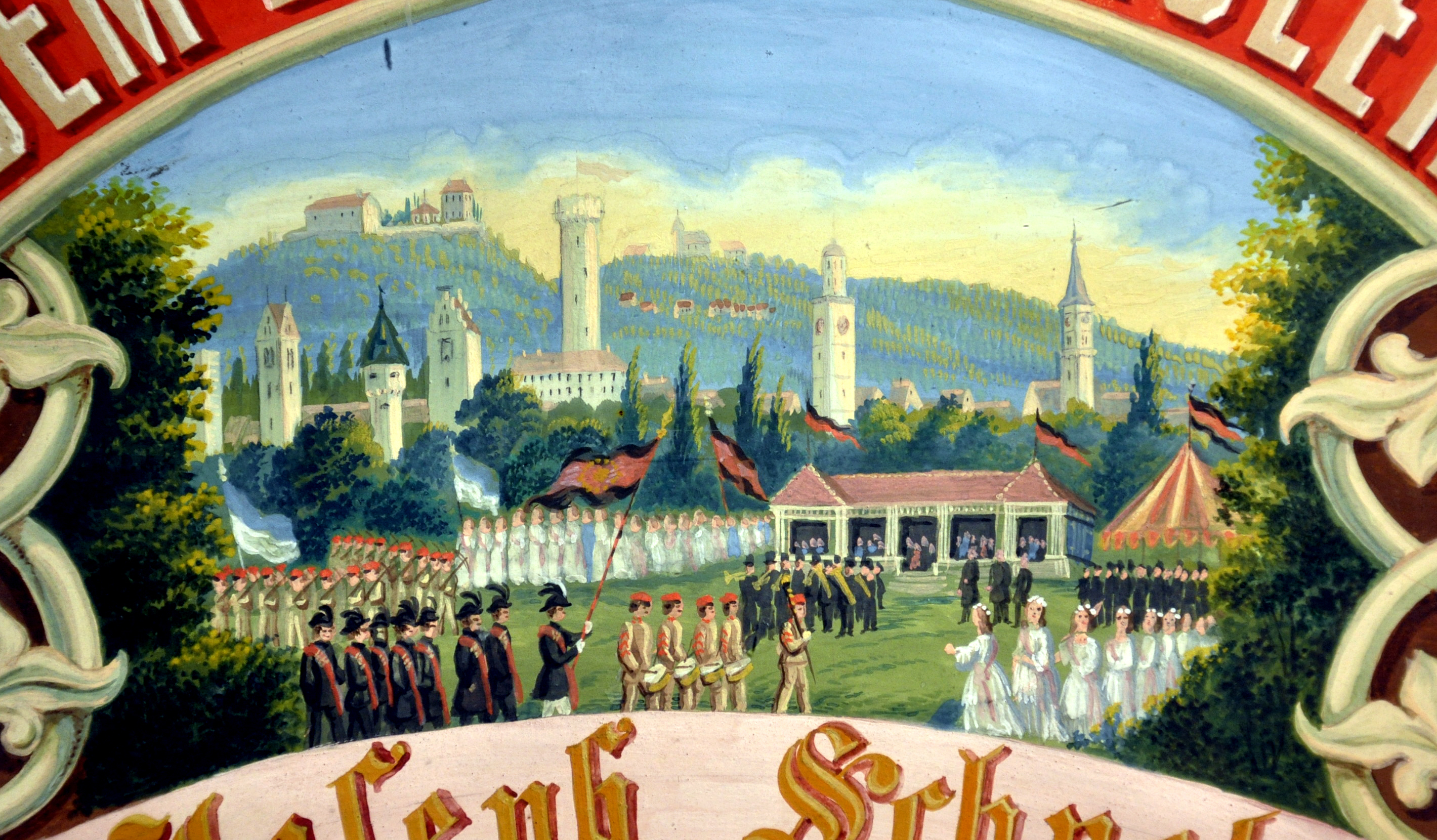
Rutenfest on an 1873 painting

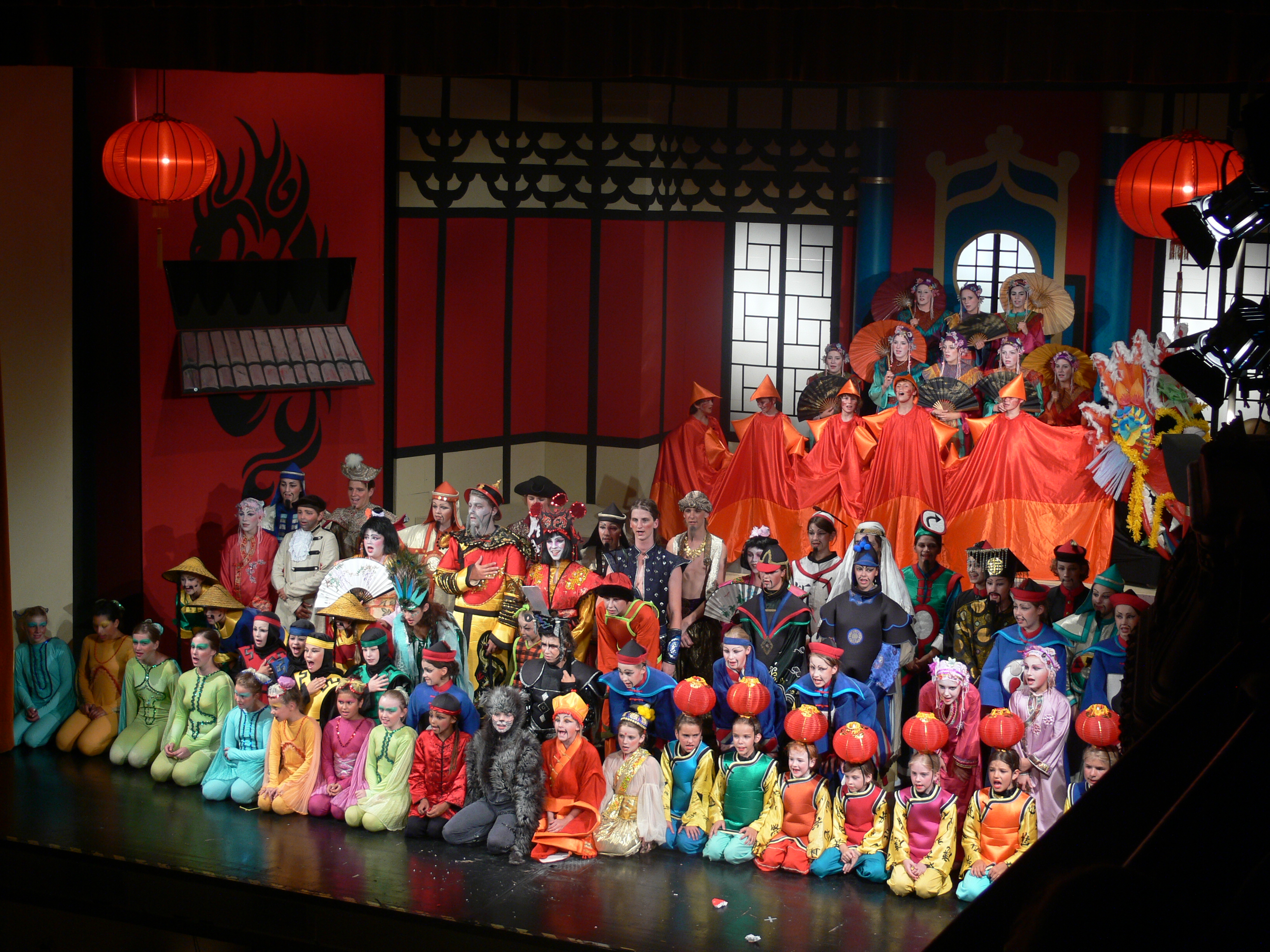
Rutentheater in 2006

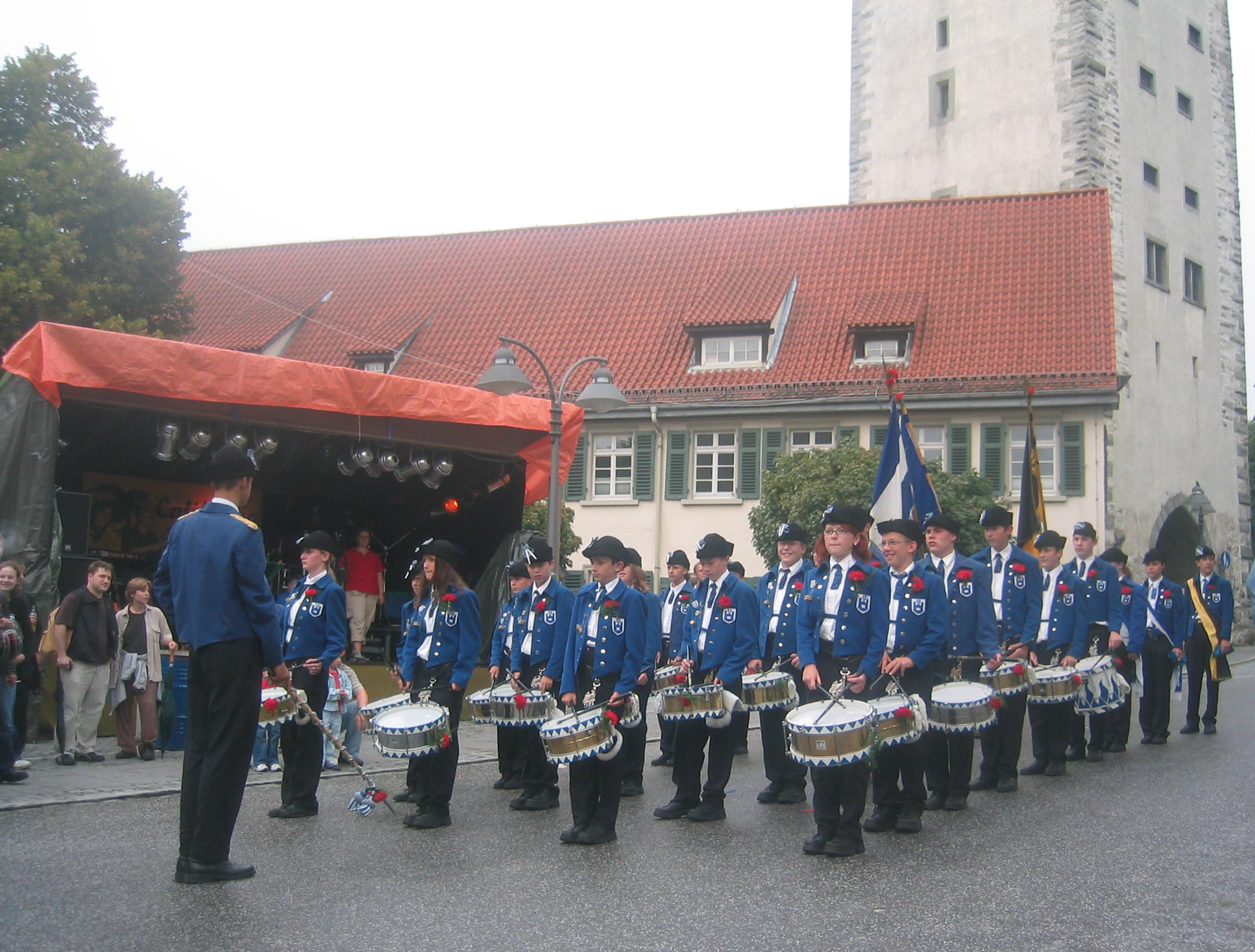
The Rutentrommler drumming group

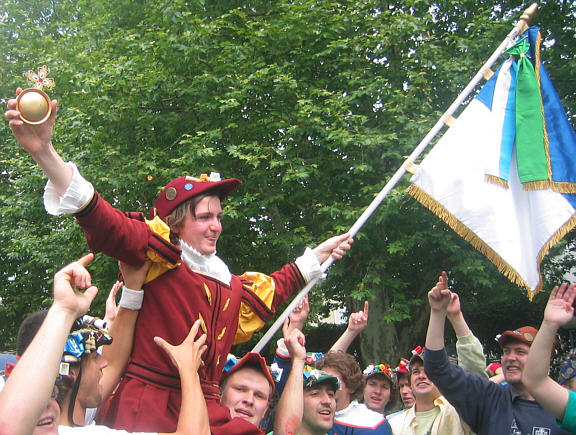
Champion marksman at the Adlerschiessen in 2004

There are several folk festivals in South Germany that bear the name "Rutenfest", notably those in Ravensburg and Landsberg am Lech (the latter spelled Ruethenfest), and a smaller festival in Bopfingen. Several explanations of the name have been brought forward over the years. Most likely, birch whips used for beating the pupils were a symbol of mastering Latin grammar, and pupils were solemnly awarded with such a birch at the end of each school term. Those birches were cut in the woods around town in some sort of school outing before the festival.

== Traditions ==
Rutenfest Ravensburg goes back to the 17th century, the custom of "going (to/with) the birches" being first mentioned in a municipal law in 1645.

Rutenfest is celebrated from the last Friday of school term ("Ruten Friday") over a long weekend until Tuesday ("Ruten Tuesday"). On "Ruten Monday", most shops and offices in Ravensburg are closed. Schools are closed on Monday and Tuesday.

During all Rutenfest days, funfair attractions (including a large mobile ferris wheel), beer gardens, beer tents and food stands are open to the public in an area north of the old town called Kuppelnau. While Rutenfest Ravensburg features several elements of Volksfests with beer gardens and funfairs like the much larger Munich Oktoberfest, it boasts a lot of local traditions that distinguish it from other German town festivals.

The citizens of Ravensburg celebrate their town with thousands of flags (in blue and white, the town's colors) that can be seen all over the town, and with a lot of local patriotism. The local anthem Mein Ravensburg im Schwabenland (My Ravensburg in the country of Swabia) is sung at all official events, and often spontaneously in beer gardens.

All official events are heralded with three cannon salutes from the town's highest watchtower, the medieval Mehlsack. These salutes can be heard across the whole town.

=== Award ceremonies ===
The oldest tradition still performed at today's Rutenfest is the solemn presentation of an award for the best female and male pupils. The tradition can be traced back to the 17th century. The awards are presented during the second of two large events titled Tanzen – Spielen – Musizieren at the multi-purpose hall Oberschwabenhalle that also feature dance, sport and music performances by local schools. The laureates are called "Oberstköniginnen“ and "Oberstfähnriche" and take part in the Monday Parade. In 2013, the tradition was changed: not only pupils of elementary secondary schools, but students of all schools are now eligible for these traditional honors. The pupils are no longer those with the best grades but those that have the best record in extracurricular activities and involvement in school life. The tradition that the pupils wear 18th-century style dresses and uniforms during the ceremony and at the parade was abolished. Hence the group has been the only one in the 2013 parade that was not wearing historical costumes but rather T-shirts and sweaters.

=== Rutentheater ===
Occasional theatre performances have been held during Rutenfest from at least 1697. Since 1821, local schools have been presenting plays and declamations, which means that Rutentheater has one of the longest traditions in German amateur theatre. Since 1898, Rutentheater is held at the sumptuous Konzerthaus theatre. As of 2012, two casts of 50 pupils (plus a pupils' wind orchestra and ballet dancers) present a fairytale production in a total of 17 performances (with c. 500 patrons each) starting one week before "Ruten Friday". The Rutentheater is directly organized and managed by the Rutenfestkommission. The performances are usually sold out well in advance.

Plays played during the last 30 years include:

- 1992 The Stolen Princess (directed by Renate Kiderlen)
- 1993 Cinderella (directed by Renate Kiderlen)
- 1994 Mother Hulda (directed by Renate Kiderlen)
- 1995 Little Peter's Journey to the Moon (directed by Renate Kiderlen)
- 1996 Snow White (directed by Renate Kiderlen)
- 1997 The Wizard of Oz (directed by Renate Kiderlen)
- 1998 The Little Witch
- 1999 A Midsummer Night's dream (directed by Brian Lausund)
- 2000 The Jungle Book (directed by Brian Lausund)
- 2001 Sally and the Philosopher's Stone (written and directed by Jürgen Sihler)
- 2002 Around the World in Eighty Days (directed by Bodo Klose)
- 2003 The Little Mermaid (directed by Bodo Klose)
- 2004 Town Musicians of Bremen (directed by Bodo Klose)
- 2005 Robin Hood (directed by Bodo Klose)
- 2006 Princess Turandot (directed by Bodo Klose)
- 2007 Tom Sawyer and Huckleberry Finn (directed by Bodo Klose)
- 2008 Alibaba And 40 Thieves (directed by Bodo Klose)
- 2009 Carmencita (an adaptation of Carmen, directed by Bodo Klose)
- 2010 The Devil With The Three Golden Hairs (directed by Bodo Klose)
- 2011 Peter Pan (directed by Bodo Klose)
- 2012 The Emperor's New Clothes (directed by Bodo Klose)
- 2013 The Beggar Princess (directed by Bodo Klose)
- 2014 The Wishing-Table (directed by Bodo Klose)
- 2015 Ratatouille (directed by Bodo Klose)
- 2016 The Treasure of Lake Fear (a Wild-West-Comedy by Ekkehard Zeim, directed by Bodo Klose)
- 2017 Cinderella (directed by Bodo Klose)
- 2018 Magic about Zinnober (directed by Bodo Klose; an adaptation by Ekkehard Zeim of E. T. A. Hoffmann's Little Zaches and the GDR movie "Zauber um Zinober")
- 2019 Aladin and the Magic Lamp (directed by Bodo Klose)
- 2020/2021 no plays due to the COVID pandemic
- 2022 The Spessart Inn (directed by Bodo Klose)
- 2023 Sleeping Beauty (directed by Bodo Klose)
- 2024 Snowwhite (directed by Bodo Klose)
- 2025 The Count of Monte Cristo (directed by Bodo Klose)
- 2026 The Beauty and the Beast (directed by Bodo Klose)

=== Drumming groups ===
Over the Rutenfest days (from Friday until Tuesday), several bands in historic costumes are marching through the city playing drums and fifes, pipes or fanfares. The groups play two or three pieces at the homes of dignitaries, former group members, and friends (a custom called Antrommeln). In return, the groups are rewarded with donations to compensate their expenses, and are sometimes invited to food and drink. Around these short performances, many citizens organize garden or street parties where their friends and old classmates are also invited. Since the drumming starts as early as 5am and stops only at 11pm, some drumming can nearly always be heard at any point in town during Rutenfest.

Some of the drumming groups are formed by pupils to represent their schools and can only be seen during the Rutenfest days:

- Rutentrommler, drumming group of pupils of all kinds of secondary schools, first mentioned in the 17th century. The Rutentrommler are the only drumming group that consists of both boys and girls (since 1994).
- The Trommlerkorps der Gymnasien is a drumming group of male grammar school (Gymnasium) pupils founded c. 1865. Twelve drummers and twelve flag bearers (called Charge) are elected by their male classmates a couple of months before the Rutenfest. Three senior officers are elected by last year's members: the Rutenhauptmann delivers several public speeches at official events and organizes the Trommlerball dance ball, the Adjutant organizes the Adlerschiessen competition, and the Tambourmajor is responsible for the drumming. These three seniors also appoint four Vortrommler (senior drummers) and three Zugführer (responsible for the marching order) from the members of last year's group.
- The Landsknechte, a drum and fife group of male 11th-grade pupils from the three municipal Gymnasium schools, were founded in 1900. Three drummers, nine fifers and thirteen Tross members are elected by their male classmates. Three senior officials are elected by last year's members: the Fahnenschwinger (standard bearer/flag spinner) and two Begleiter (adjutants). The Landsknechte wear colorful Renaissance-style Landsknecht costumes.
- Schützentrommler, drumming group of male Realschule secondary school pupils, founded in 1967. Formed from the 8th grade of the Realschule Ravensburg (and three elected from the previous year as "Schützenoberst", "Oberschützen" and "Tambourmajor"), this group mainly features drummers in 3 different groups (Front, Choir and Base-Drums) and three flag spinners bearing the colours of Ravensburg and Baden-Württemberg.
- Fahnenschwingertruppe St. Konrad, drum and fife group of male pupils of the Catholic School Centre St. Konrad, founded in 1979. The group features ten flag spinners who bear flags with the coats of arms of Ravensburg and other former Imperial cities.
- Turmfalken, drum, chalumeau and fife group of female pupils from all local Gymnasium schools, founded in 2022

Former members of the pupils' drumming groups (Ehemalige) usually keep the hat of their costumes and wear this hat lifelong during the festival. Ehemalige are organized in clubs and organize various parties and events during the Rutenfest and at other times of the year.

There are also several drumming groups of male grown-up citizens that are exclusively heard at Rutenfest:

- Altentrommler ("senior drummers"), a drumming group that only performs every five years when the Altenschiessen takes place (the years known as Altschützenjahr). The origins of the group can be traced to 1906 when a group of respected citizens that called themselves Protesttrommler protested against the decision of the local grammar school headmaster to hold classes on Ruten Monday and Ruten Tuesday. They borrowed drums from a local sports club, marched to the school and started to drum, which made it impossible to continue with the teaching. In 1907, they repeated this demonstration. From 1908, both days were holidays for the pupils again. From 1910, several of the Protesttrommler members formed the new Altentrommler. Since then, the group has been a part of every Altschützenjahr. Members have to be at least 40 years old and are elected by the existing members.
- Neue Spohngruppe, a drumming group founded in 1965
- Mehlsäcke, a pipe band founded in 1990
- Trommlerkorps aller ehemaligen Realschüler, former Schützentrommler members and other former Realschule pupils, active only every five years when the bow shooting of former Realschule pupils takes place

The following fanfare bands play not only at Rutenfest, but take part in Rutenfest events including the Antrommeln custom:

- Fanfarenzug Tell, founded in 1958
- Fanfarenzug Rauenspurg
- Fanfarenzug St. Florian

=== Parade ===
On "Ruten Monday" morning, a big parade called Historischer Rutenfestzug with roughly 6,000 participants winds its way through the old town of Ravensburg. 4,500 pupils and adults parade in historical costumes presenting the town's history from medieval times, when Ravensburg was an international trading centre, to the 19th century. The three-hour-long parade also includes 120 horse-drawn carriages, all Rutenfest drumming groups, and many wind and brass bands from Upper Swabia with c. 1,200 musicians in total. In 2012, c. 50,000 spectators lined the streets along the parade.

=== Shooting competitions ===
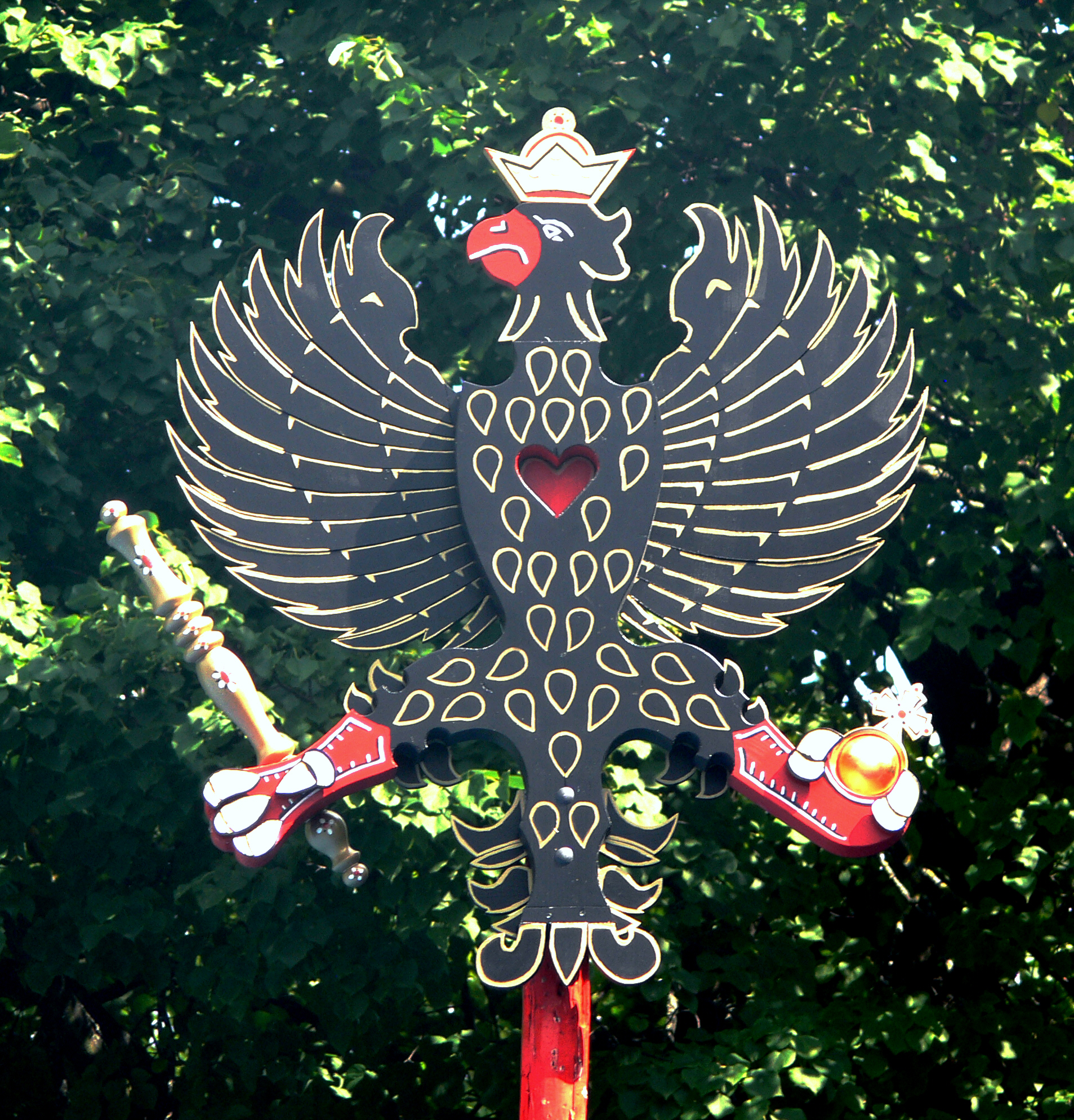
Adlerschiessen eagle

The festival features several annual shooting competitions where local pupils compete for the title Schützenkönig (champion marksman). All these open-air competitions are held in the Kuppelnau area.

- The oldest Rutenfest shooting competition is the Adlerschiessen (de), a crossbow Popinjay shooting on a wooden Imperial Eagle (from the old German coat of arms), with the Imperial Orb in the eagle's left claw as highest trophy. Other trophies are the sceptre, the crown and the eagle's head and heart. All feathers can also be shot and entitle to prizes. The first Adlerschiessen took place in 1823. As of 2012, 816 male pupils of local grammar schools took part in the competition. In 2003, a similar competition for female pupils was launched (with 618 participants in 2012). Both competitions are held simultaneously on "Ruten Tuesday" afternoon. Especially the members of the Landsknechte and those of the Trommlerkorps (who organize the event) rival each other in the hunt for the title of Schützenkönig.
- In the 1960s, Bogenschiessen, a bow and arrow shooting for Realschule pupils (male and female) was introduced. The wooden target depicts the towers and gates of the old town of Ravensburg, with the Mehlsack tower as the highest trophy. The shooting is held on "Ruten Monday" afternoon. As with the Adlerschießen, the two secondary school drum Groups, the Schützentrommler and the Fahnenschwinger St. Konrad vie for the crown of Schützenkönig intensively.
- In 2001, the Wappenschiessen crossbow shooting was introduced for Hauptschule pupils (male and female). It has later been opened to pupils of all local secondary schools that aren't eligible for Adlerschiessen and Bogenschiessen. The target depicts the town's coat of arms, with the cross from the coat of arms as the highest trophy. The shooting is held on "Ruten Saturday" afternoon.

Every five years, thousands of local grammar school alumni from all over the world gather to the Altenschiessen (roughly translated as "shooting by seniors") on "Ruten Sunday". Targets and rules are the same as those of the Adlerschiessen. Participants shoot in reverse age order, with the oldest participant starting the event (in 2015 this was Guido Erb, born in 1920). The champion is called Altschützenkönig. The first Altenschiessen was held in 1900. In 2015, the competition had over 2,300 participants. To deal with this large group of shooters, the shooting was first split. "Younger" Shooters (Age 44 and younger) shoot on the Wappenadler, similar to the original target, but with coat of arms in place of the three trophies Imperial Orb, sceptre and Heart. In 2025 the group of participants was capped to further manage the amount of shooters.

Realschule alumni organize a similar alumni shooting with bows and arrows (Bogenschiessen aller ehemaligen RealschülerInnen) that has taken place every five years since 1996.

=== Other events ===
On "Ruten Friday" afternoon in a ceremony in the Schwörsaal hall, the "Trommlerkorps" is presented with school flags and other insignia by the mayor of Ravensburg. After that, the festival is officially opened by the mayor on the central Marienplatz square, followed by a performance of all pupils' drumming groups.

On "Ruten Saturday" night, Ravensburg's central square, the Marienplatz, is populated by some 20,000 people at the Fröhlicher Auftakt (roughly translated as "blightful beginning"). This event has continually grown since its first instalment in the 1960s. Wine (and increasingly beer) is served.

On "Ruten Sunday" morning, an ecumenical open-air church service is held by the local Catholic and Protestant parishes in one of the churches. In the 2010s this service was held open-air on the central square Marienplatz.

Public fireworks on "Ruten Tuesday" night mark the end of the five days of Rutenfest.

In the aftermath, two further events take place:

- Trommlerball ("drummers' ball") on the following Thursday night is a dance ball and society event organized by the Trommlerkorps der Gymnasien, roughly comparable to a débutante ball. All Trommlerkorps members take part in social dances with their Trommlerbraut ("drummer's bride"). Initially held at the Konzerthaus until ca. the 1960s, the ball was held in the congress centre in the neighbouring town of Weingarten until 2017 and again from 2022. In 2018 and 2019, the ball took place in the Oberschwabenhalle multi-purpose hall in Ravensburg. The Trommlerball attracts between 500 and 1,000 guests.
- Rutenvergraben (birch burying) is celebrated on Saturday night at the Veitsburg, the castle that towers above the town. The name of this event is purely symbolical (hence nothing is actually buried). Citizens meet once again in a large beer garden, and the Rutenfest drumming groups play for the last time.

== Bibliography ==
- Helmut Binder, Alfred Lutz, Markus Glonnegger: Das Ravensburger Rutenfest in Geschichte und Gegenwart. Biberacher Verlagsdruckerei, Biberach 1997, ISBN 3-924489-87-4
