= Gustav Gerster =

German textile company

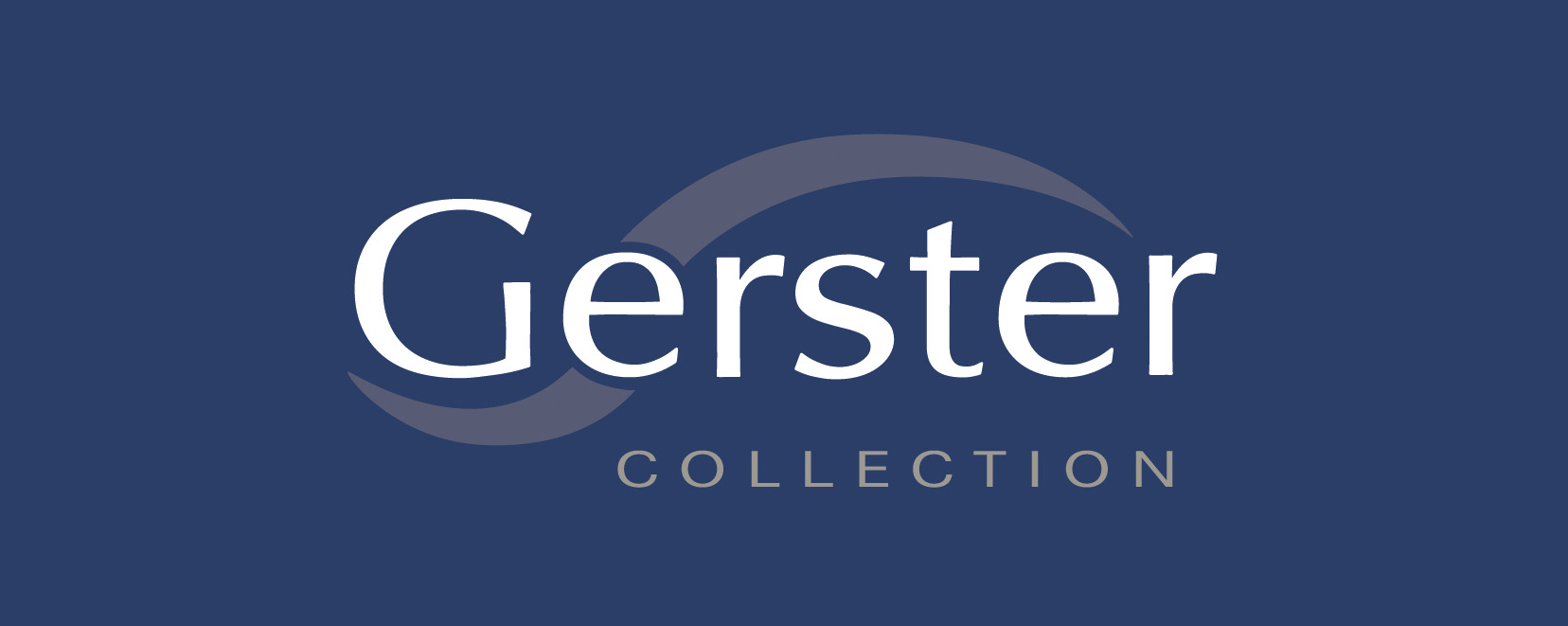
- Type: GmbH & Co. KG
- Industry: Textile industry
- Founded: 1882
- Headquarters: Biberach an der Riß, Germany
- Key people: Jens Gerster, Martin Gerster
- Revenue: EUR 40 million
- Number of employees: 450
- Website: www.gerster.com

The Gustav Gerster GmbH & Co. KG is a family-owned company based in Biberach an der Riß, Germany. It produces curtains, ready made fabrics, curtain tapes, trimmings and technical textiles.

== History ==
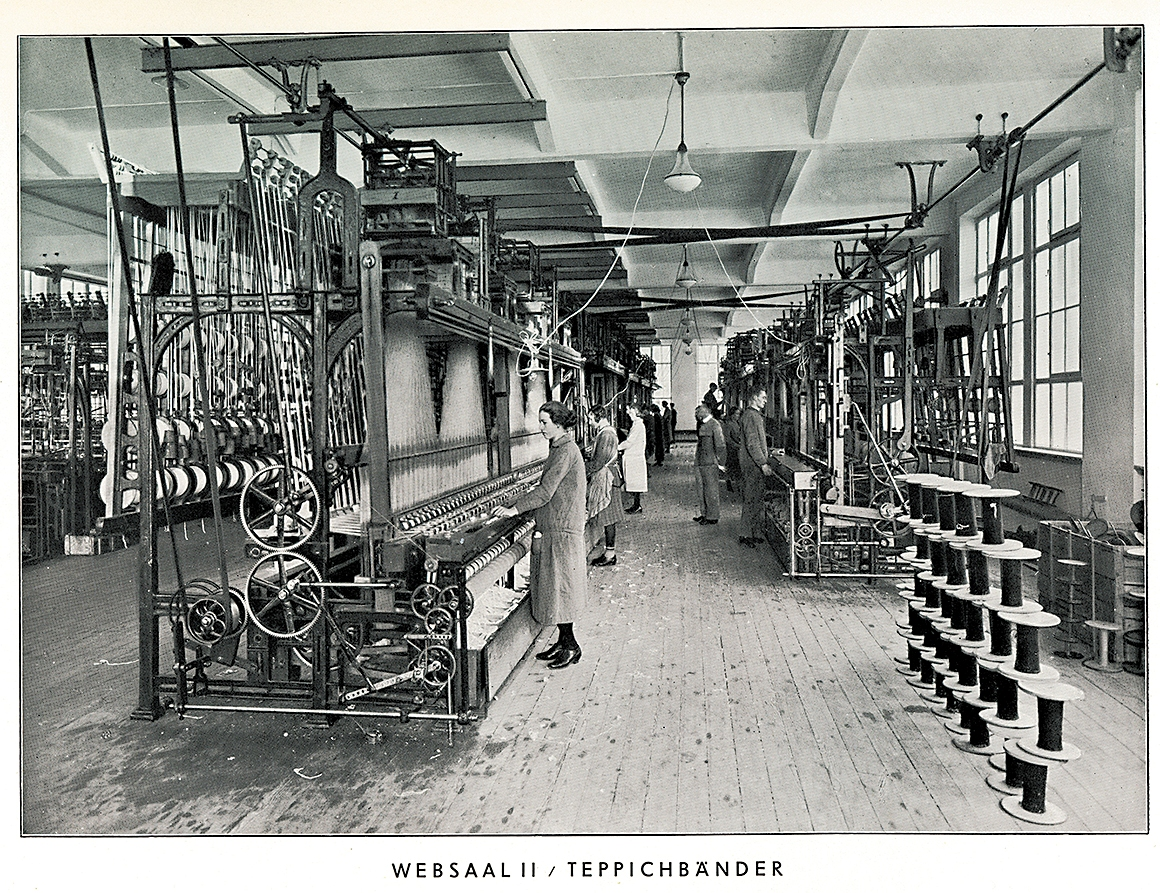
Weaving hall in 1904

Founded in 1882 as a small textile trimmings company, Gerster developed into the largest trimmings, tieback and tassel manufacturer in Germany.

In the 1950s, Gerster began the production of curtain tapes. Now the company manufactures over 40 million metres per year.

It has been about 25 years that curtain production was added to the manufacturing programme.

In 2004, Gerster TechTex was created as a new business unit, specially designed for the production of technical narrow tapes. One main focus of this new department is the use of reinforcing and auxiliary materials for the composite-market.

There are 450 employees producing high-quality articles in the headquarters in Germany (Biberach) and in the subsidiary in Poland (opened in 1995).

In 2007, Gustav Gerster celebrated its 125th birthday.

== Products ==
- Curtains (woven, embroidered and printed fabrics…)
- Ready made fabrics (eyelet and tab panels, café-style curtains and roman blinds...)
- Curtain tapes
- Trimmings and accessories (decorative tiebacks, tassels, cords and fringes)
- Technical textiles (resin distribution tapes, gussets, spiral bands, hoses…)

== Charitable work ==
The Gustav Gerster GmbH & Co. KG supports the Biberacher Schützenfest, a transregional known festival, by providing donations and products of the company for the parade-, costume- and theatre-equipment.
