= Karl Friedrich Abt =

German actor

Karl Friedrich Abt (1743, in Stuttgart – 20 November 1783, in Bremen) was an actor in the Holy Roman Empire.

Abt began acting in 1766, mostly in southern and south-west Germany. In Biberach, he abducted his wife Felicitas from a reputable family which refused to give her away. She was born in 1746 in Biberach, and gained a reputation as an excellent actress and as the first German actress to play Hamlet.

Abt ventured through Saxony and Thuringia, finally opening up a stage in The Hague (Den Haag) with the support of the court and the high society on 16 October 1772 with the intention to introduce German theatre to the Netherlands. There, he greatly contributed to popularize German dramatic literature. On his stage, Abt played the first translations of Christian Felix Weiße's Romeo and Juliet and Lessing's Emilia Galotti.

After a stay in Düsseldorf, the historical recordings find Abt again in 1773, travelling in Leiden where he had built a transportable wooden theatre. With this stage he continued travelling to 's-Hertogenbosch, Utrecht, Kleve, Nijmegen and finally again to The Hague where he was ruined by a local competitor. He travelled on to Haarlem where he found support from the Friends of the Arts. In Amsterdam, his performance was prohibited by the authorities. Abt visited several villages in North Holland, including Diemer-Meer near Amsterdam where he became very popular.

A severe illness in his family forced him to sell the theatre to private investors. There, Abt became an artistic supervisor. In 1776, this company also went bankrupt. He recruited a new troupe and settled in Münster, visiting Göttingen, Hanover, Bremen and other towns in the wider area. He lost the direction of the troupe in 1780, hired a new troupe in 1781 and continued travelling the area. Abt died in Bremen in 1783.

== Sources ==
- August Förster [in German] (1875). "Abt, Karl Friedrich". Allgemeine Deutsche Biographie (in German). Vol. 1. Leipzig: Duncker & Humblot. pp. 24–25.
