= St.-Martins-Chorknaben Biberach =

German boys' and men's choir

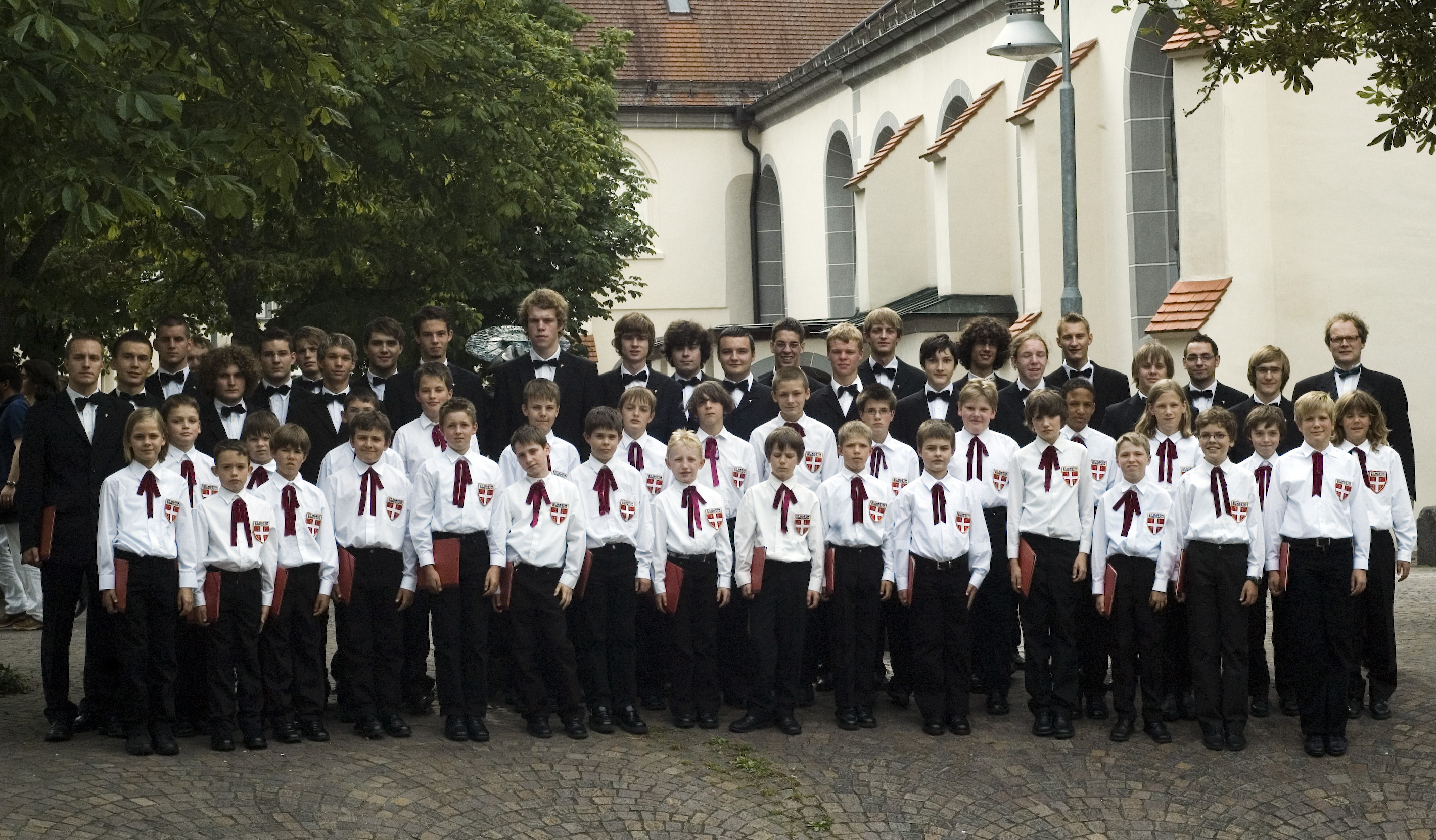

Background information
- Origin: Biberach an der Riß, Germany
- Genres: Church music
- Members: 90 (SATB)
- Website: www.chorknaben-biberach.de

The St.-Martins-Chorknaben Biberach (English: St Martin's Boys' Choir Biberach) is a boys' and men's choir from Biberach an der Riß in southern Germany. The choir was founded in 1962 and has since been a member of the Pueri Cantores, an international association of Catholic youth choirs.

The choir regularly takes part in services in its home parish St Martin and the surrounding parishes. On their annual concert tour, the choirboys also perform abroad.

== Repertoire ==
The St.-Martins-Chorknaben sing sacred music – usually a cappella, that is without instrumental sound. Their repertoire covers a variety of periods in musical history, from Gregorian chant, to Bach and Mozart, to modern composers like Poulenc and Miškinis. The choir rehearses twice a week. As the need arises, the singers receive extra voice training. Moreover, there is a rehearsal weekend twice a year.

== Concert tours ==
On their annual concert tour, the St.-Martins-Chorknaben have a goal of contributing to understanding among nations. They try to stay with host families to get to know the country and its people. In 2002 the St.-Martins-Chorknaben stayed on Guernsey. Inhabitants of this Channel Island were interned in Oflag V-B in Biberach during World War II. Through their visit, the choirboys contributed to strengthening the partnership between Guernsey and Biberach.

== Media ==
DVD:

Hinter den Stimmen – Die Chorknaben aus Biberach (English: Behind the Voices – The Choirboys from Biberach)

The documentary had its premiere in November 2009 at the film festival of Biberach. The DVD was released in July 2010.

CD:

Cantate Domino (2009)
