= Rißegg =

Coordinates: 48°04′N 9°48′E

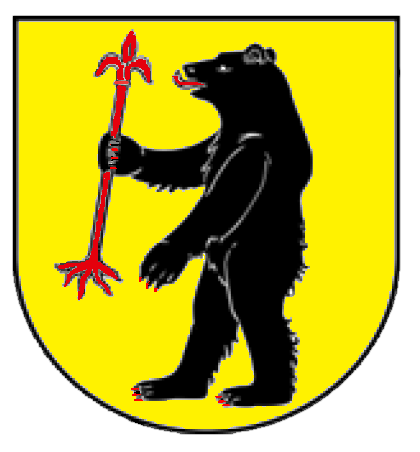
Wappen

Rissegg (Rißegg) is a part of the city of Biberach/Riß and a municipality in the district of Biberach, Baden-Württemberg, Germany. It is a village of about 2,420 inhabitants and was founded in the 9th or 10th century. There is a Free Catholic school with about 187 students.
