= Andreas Gerster =

Liechtenstein footballer

Personal information
- Date of birth: 24 November 1982 (age 43)
- Place of birth: Liechtenstein
- Height: 1.80 m (5 ft 11 in)
- Position: Midfielder

Senior career*
Years	Team	Apps	(Gls)
2000–2006	FC Vaduz	101	(1)
2006	TSV Hartberg	7	(0)
2006–2010	USV Eschen/Mauren	17	(0)
2010–2020	FC Triesenberg	0	(0)

International career^{‡}
2001–2009	Liechtenstein	38	(0)
- * Club domestic league appearances and goals as of 27 June 2022 ‡ National team caps and goals as of 21 November 2009

Andreas Gerster (born 24 November 1982) is a former international footballer from Liechtenstein who played as a midfielder. Gerster last played club football for FC Triesenberg, and formerly played for FC Vaduz, TSV Hartberg and USV Eschen/Mauren.
