= Ralf Hofmann =

Mayor of Schweinfurt from 2026

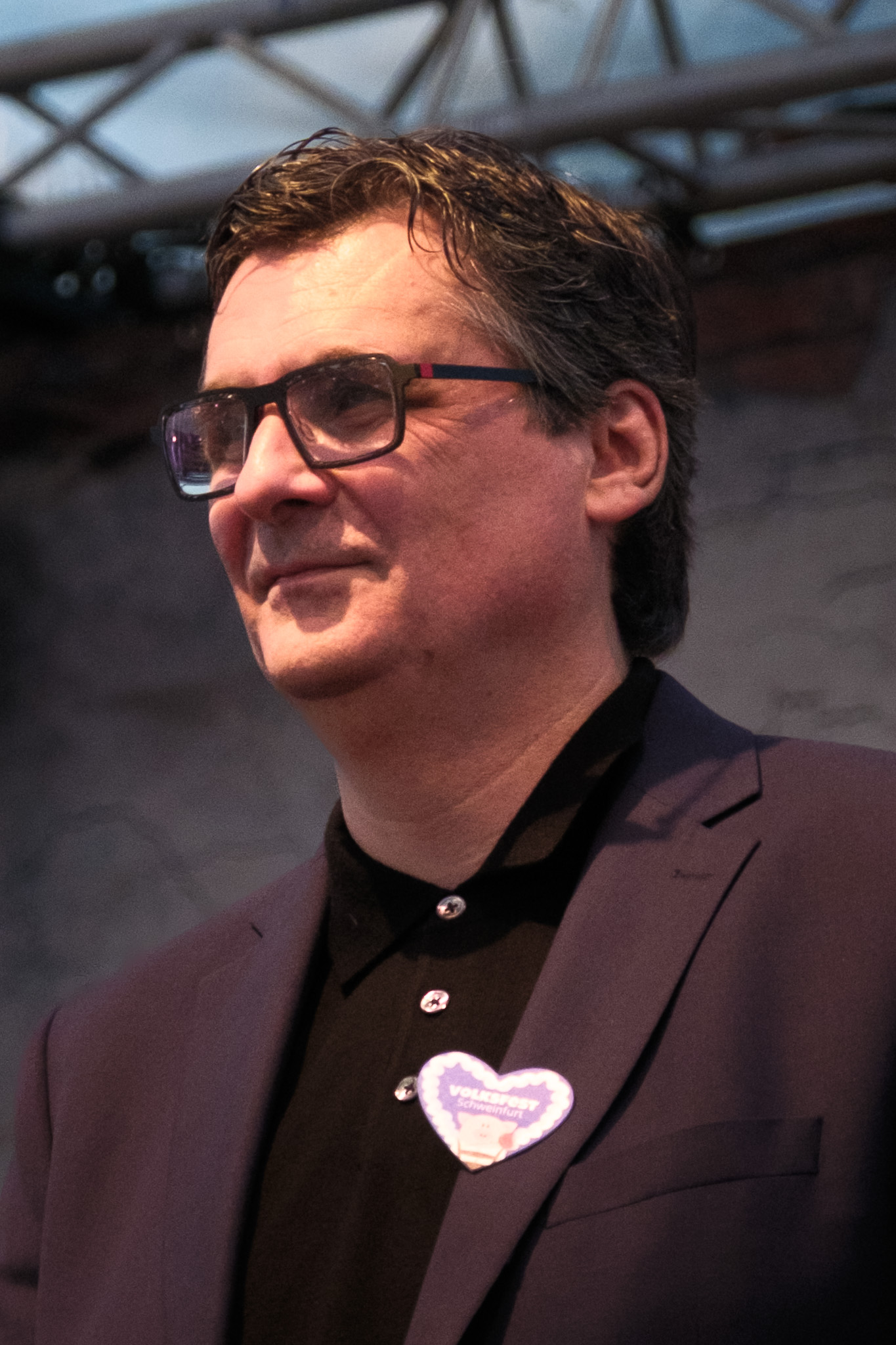
- Ralf Hofmann at the opening of the 2026 Volksfest

Mayor of Schweinfurt
- In office 1 May 2026 – 2032
- Preceded by: Sebastian Remelé

Personal details
- Born: 1967 (age 58–59) Werneck, West Germany
- Party: Social Democratic Party of Germany (SPD)
- Children: 2
- Education: University of Bamberg
- Occupation: Politician, event manager

Ralf Hofmann (born 1967) is a German local politician and event organiser from the Social Democratic Party of Germany (SPD), serving as the mayor of Schweinfurt since May 2026. His election returned the Schweinfurt mayoralty to the SPD after more than three decades of Christian Social Union (CSU) leadership.

== Early life and career ==
Hofmann studied political science at the University of Bamberg. Since 1993 he has been self-employed, running an event management agency. He is married and has two daughters.

== Political career ==
Hofmann is a member of the Social Democratic Party of Germany. He served as a member of the Schweinfurt city council from 1996 to 2000, and rejoined the council in 2014. Additionally, he served for several years as the parliamentary leader Fraktionsvorsitzender (German) of the SPD city council faction.

=== Mayor of Schweinfurt ===
In the 2026 local elections, Hofmann ran as the SPD candidate for mayor Oberbürgermeister (German). In the first round of voting on 8 March 2026, he received 37.6% of the vote. In the run-off election on 22 March 2026, he defeated Oliver Schulte (CSU) with 67.7% of the vote, successfully being elected to the office. He took office on 1 May 2026, serving a six-year term.
