= Pestalozzi-Gymnasium Biberach =

School in Biberach an der Riss, Germany

Coordinates: 48°05′51″N 9°47′41″E

Pestalozzi-Gymnasium
- Biberach an der Riß, Baden-Württemberg; Germany

Information
- Former name: Equal participation private daughters' school; German: Paritätische private Töchterschule; (1860-1970)
- School type: Gymnasium
- Established: 1860; 166 years ago
- Founder: Fortunée Niederer
- Teaching staff: c. 100
- Gender: Girls (1860-1970); Mixed (1970-present)
- Enrollment: c. 1,250 (2005)

The Pestalozzi-Gymnasium in Biberach an der Riß, Baden-Württemberg, Germany is a Gymnasium (high school).

== School Structure ==
In 2005, it comprised 1,250 students and 100 teachers.

== History ==
The school was founded by Fortunée Niederer, a student of Swiss educationalist Johann Heinrich Pestalozzi in 1860. It was originally named the Paritätische private Töchterschule ("Equal participation private daughters' school"). Originally an all-girls school, in 1970 it was renamed "Pestalozzi-Gymnasium"; at the same time it became co-educational.

== Alumni ==
- 2002 Philipp Käßbohrer, producer and director
- 2007 Steffen Deibler, swimmer und olympia participant
- 2009 Markus Deibler, swimmer und olympia participant
- 2009 Loris Karius, Newcastle United F.C. reserve goalkeeper attended Pestalozzi-Gymnasium Biberach until his move to England in 2009.
