= Biberacher Schützenfest =

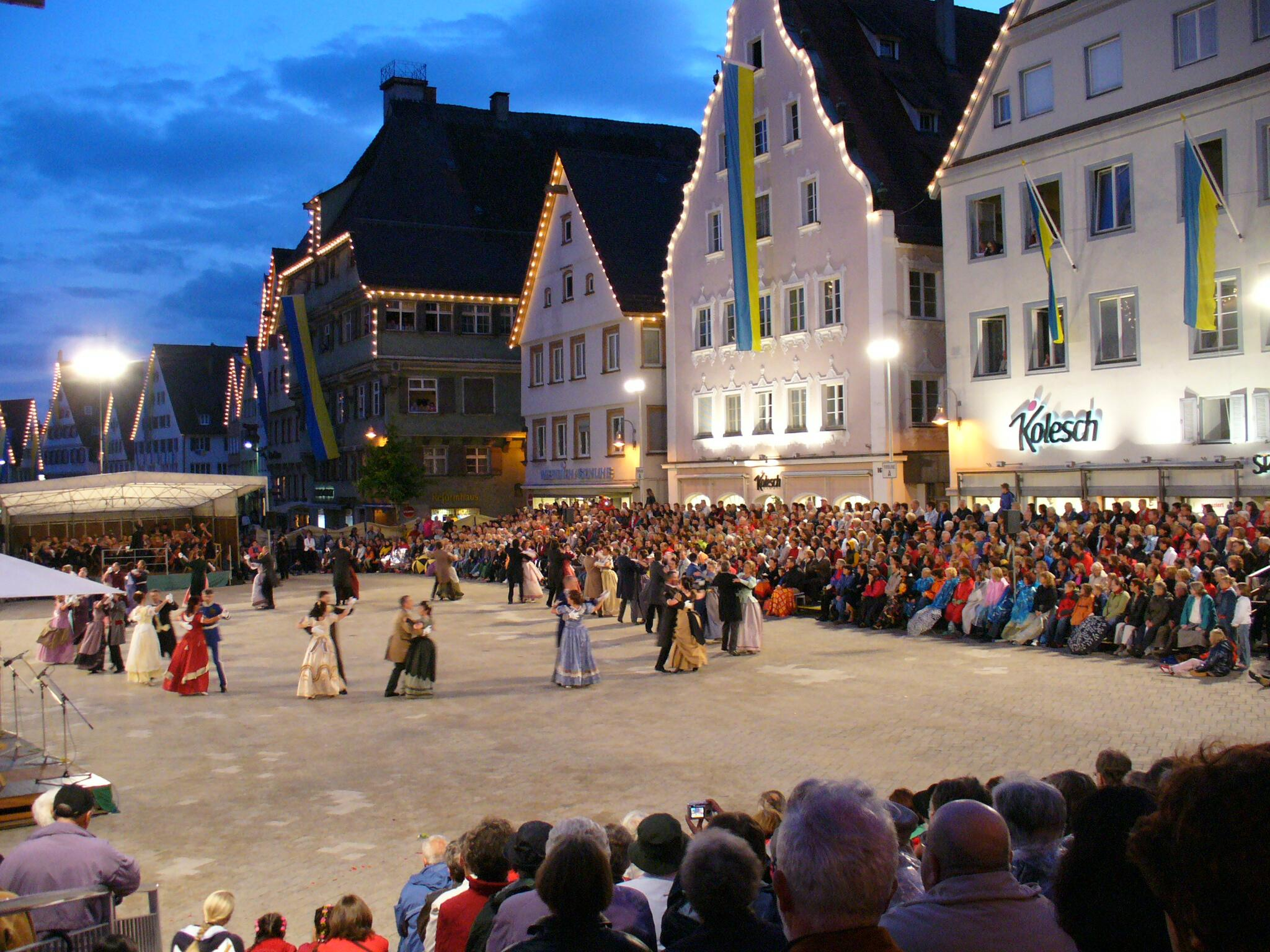
Dance through the centuries ("Tanz durch die Jahrhunderte")

The "Biberacher Schützenfest" is a Volksfest: a traditional children and town festival in Biberach an der Riß. It is held annually in July and was mentioned for the first time in an official protocol in 1668. Throughout a duration of nine days, various large venues are held, mostly with historical background, but as well with modern music and dance. Furtherthermore, there is a strong focus on entertainment for and involvement of children and pupils. At the fair, visitors can enjoy various rides, (local) food stalls, a beer tent and various historical beergardens ("Bierkeller") with live music.

Before, during and for a short time after the festival, children and teenagers perform the "Schützentheater" with yearly changing, e.g. fairy tales from the Brothers Grimm.

== History ==
=== Origin and naming ===
Despite the equality in naming, there is no relation between the Biberacher Schützenfest and festivals with the same name in western and northern Germany. The exact origin of the tradition and the naming is unknown. It is assumed that the original event was celebrated as a school festival as well as a memorial day for the plague and the Black Death. The name is most likely derived from the venue, the so-called "Schützenberg" (Rifleman Hill, the name of the outer/lower part of the Gigelberg hill).

== Highlights ==
The festival week is covered by various events held throughout the city, mostly in and around the city center.

=== Opening ceremony ===
During the opening ceremony, the so-called "Abnahme", the marching bands from local schools as well as affiliated bands (mostly led and played by pupils) demonstrate their skills in front of a broad audience (including officials) in Biberach's market place. The ceremony ends by officially opening the Schützenfest by everyone (participants as well as officials and visitors) sing together the unofficial local anthem "All is joy around me".

=== Parades ===
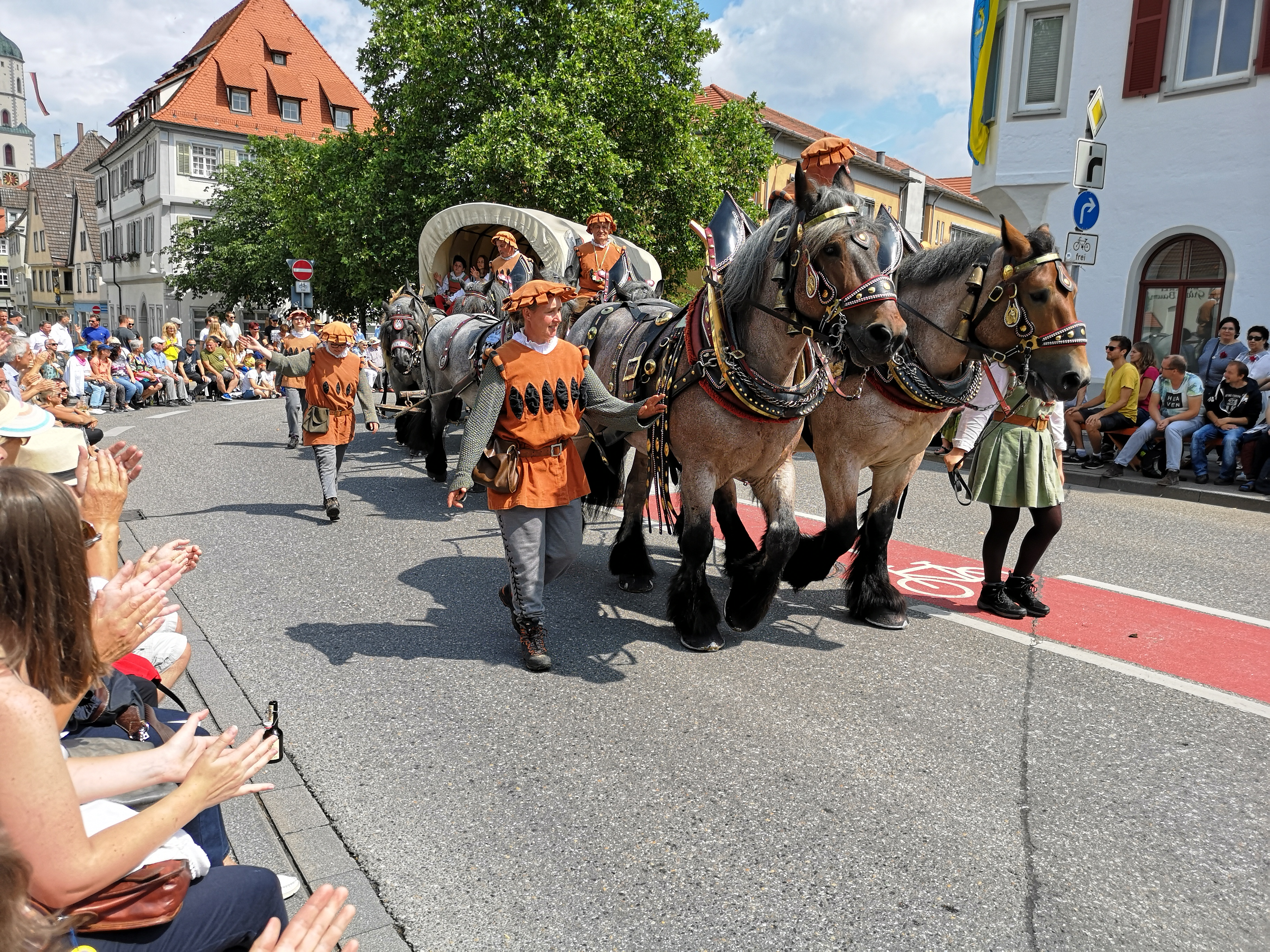
Horse drawn carriage at a parade at the Biberacher Schuetzenfest

Various parades are conducted throughout the festival week, such as a parade for age groups celebrating milestone birthdays in the same year, a parade dedicated to pupils and two historical parades which demonstrate and narrate the history of the city.

The historical groups in the parades are accompanied with large music groups and marching bands, from local villages around the city as well as from local schools. Many groups include animals in their themes such as horses (up to 200), ponies, goats, cows and wild birds.

=== Camp Life ===
At the end of the historical parades, some groups team up to demonstrate ancient camp life at the Gigelberg hill where they cook on campfires, feed their horses and perform dances along with live music.

=== Dance through the centuries ===
In three evenings throughout the festival week, various dancing groups perform the "dance throughout the centuries" in Biberach's market place. In the dancing event with live music, the groups guid the audience though different eras in dancing, covering farmer's dances, renaissance dance and dances from the rococo era but also modern dances like charleston, rock'n'roll and break dance.

=== Fairground ===
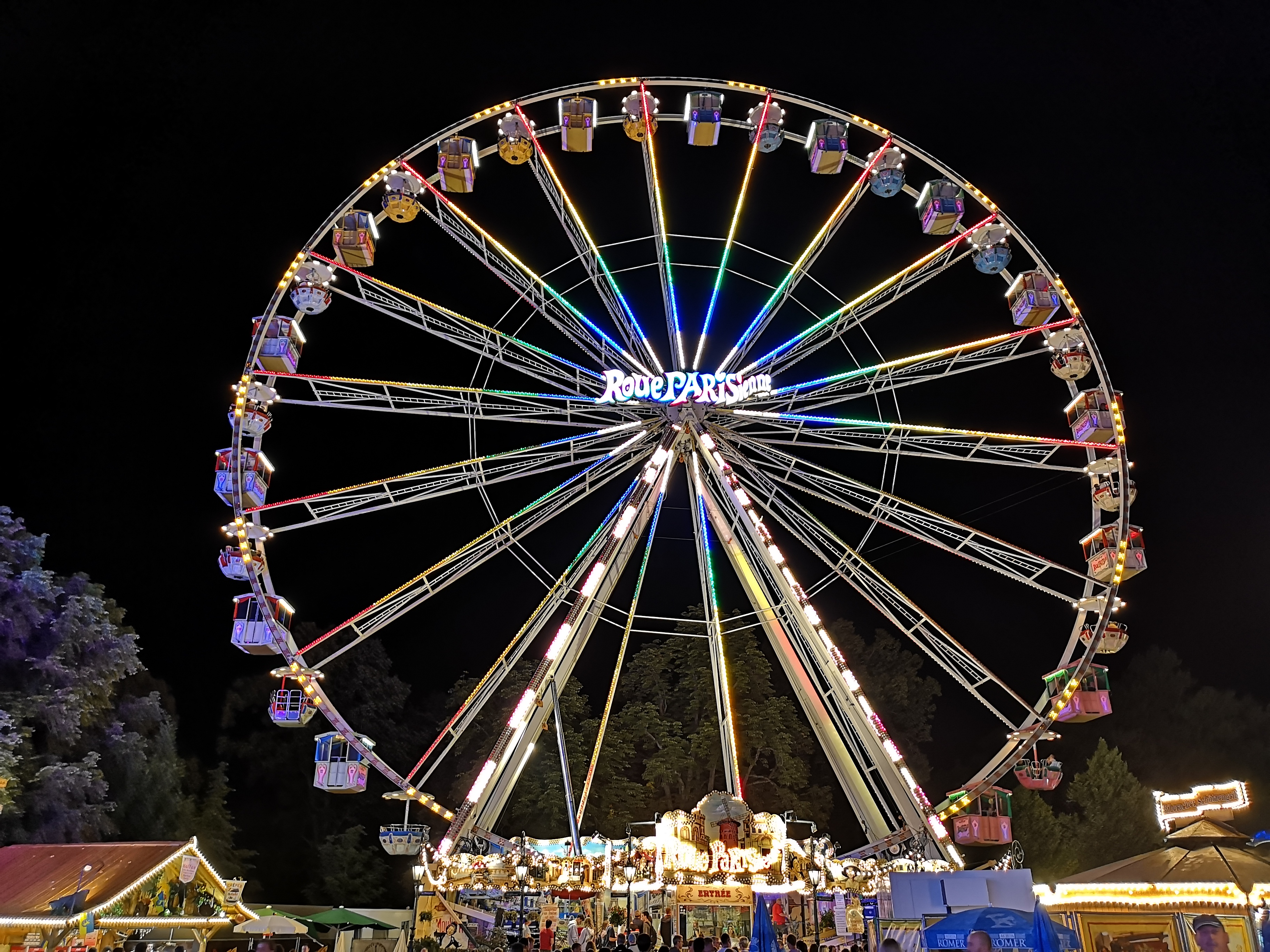
Ferris wheel on the fair ground of the Biberacher Schützenfest

The fairground on the Gigelberg hill offers various rides for children and adults as well as booths with games and a broad variation of (local) food.

=== Fireworks ===
On Friday towards the end of the festival week, people can watch the big fireworks (shot from the Gigelberg hill into Biberachs' sky) from the hill itself, from the city center or from various elevated places around the city.

=== Schützentheater ===
The Schützentheater is a theater played by children and teenagers shortly before, during and some days after the festival week.

== Literature ==
Various publications cover the history of the "Biberacher Schützenfest" and the "Schützentheater", published by Fritz Kolesch, Achim Zepp and Christa Graupner (amongst others).
