= Biberach an der Riß =

- Town
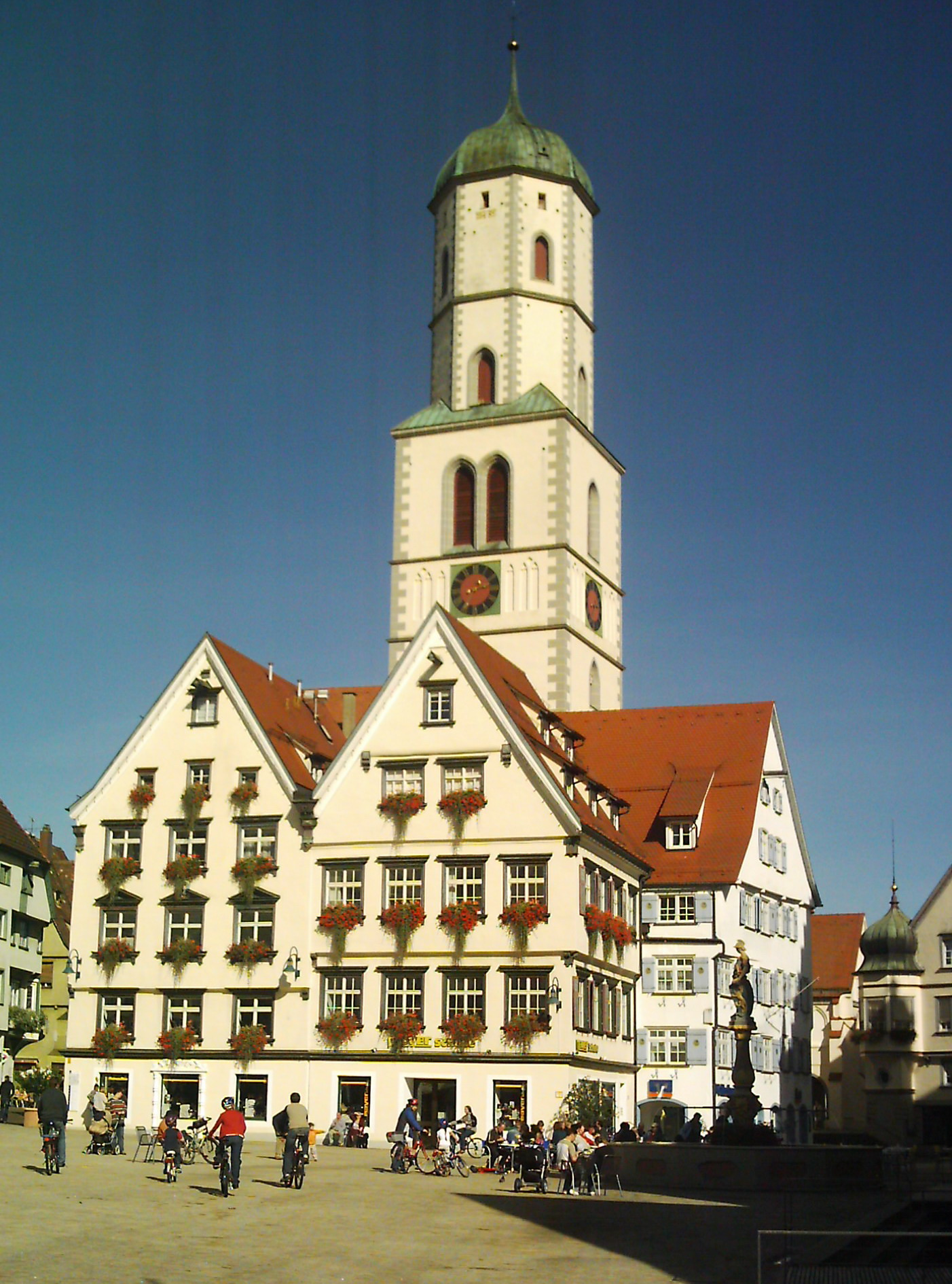
- Market and the tower of St. Martin's Church

- Coat of arms

- Location of Biberach an der Riß within Biberach district
- Interactive map of Biberach an der Riß
- Location within Germany Location within Baden-Württemberg
- Coordinates: 48°6′N 9°47′E
- Country: Germany
- State: Baden-Württemberg
- Admin. region: Tübingen
- District: Biberach
- Subdivisions: Town centre and 4 districts

Government
  - Mayor (2020–28): Norbert Zeidler (Ind.)

Area
  - Total: 72.15 km^{2} (27.86 sq mi)
- Elevation: 533 m (1,749 ft)

Population (2025-12-31)
  - Total: 34,275
  - Density: 475.1/km^{2} (1,230/sq mi)
- Time zone: UTC+01:00 (CET)
  - Summer (DST): UTC+02:00 (CEST)
- Postal codes: 88400
- Dialling codes: 07351
- Vehicle registration: BC
- Website: biberach-riss.de

Biberach an der Riß (German pronunciation: [ˈbiːbəʁax ʔan deːɐ̯ ˈʁɪs], lit. 'Biberach on the Riß'; Swabian: Bibra), often referred to as simply Biberach (German pronunciation: [ˈbiːbəʁax]), is a town in southern Germany. It is the capital of Biberach district, in the Upper Swabia region of the German state (Land) of Baden-Württemberg. It is called Biberach an der Riß after the small river Riß which flows through the city to distinguish it from the other towns of similar names.

== Geography ==
Biberach has a population of about 32,000 and is located in Upper Swabia between the river Danube and Lake Constance.

=== Populated places ===
The districts of Biberach comprise the inner city (with the quarters Bachlangen, Bergerhausen, Birkendorf, Burren, Fünf Linden, Gaisental, Hagenbuch, Jordanbad, Mumpfental, Reichenbach and Wolfentalmühle) and its suburban, integrated villages Rißegg, Rindenmoos, Ringschnait, Stafflangen and Mettenberg.

== History ==
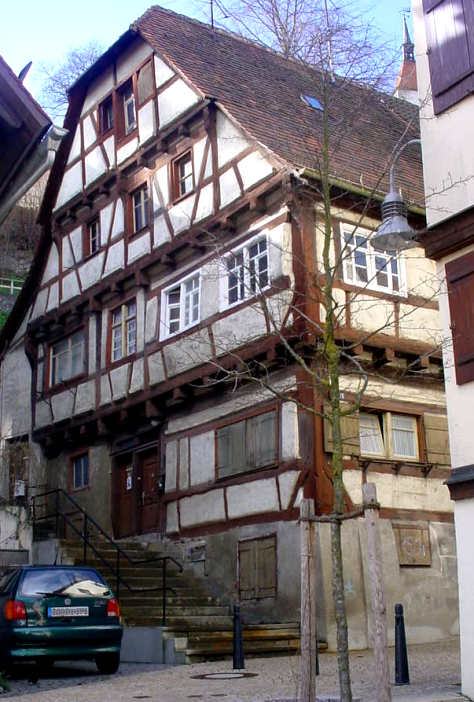
Part of Weberberg

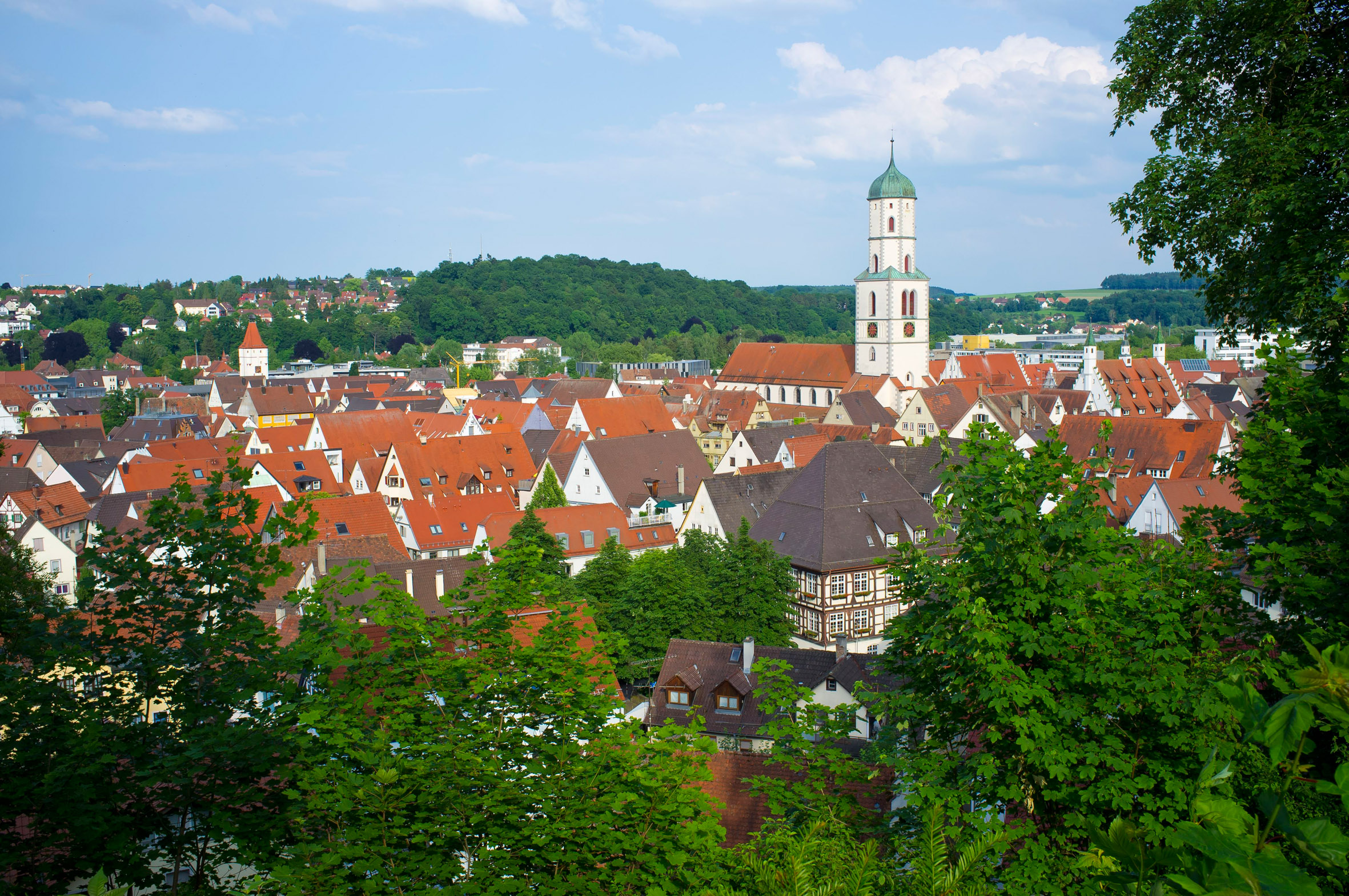
View of the rooftops of the city center

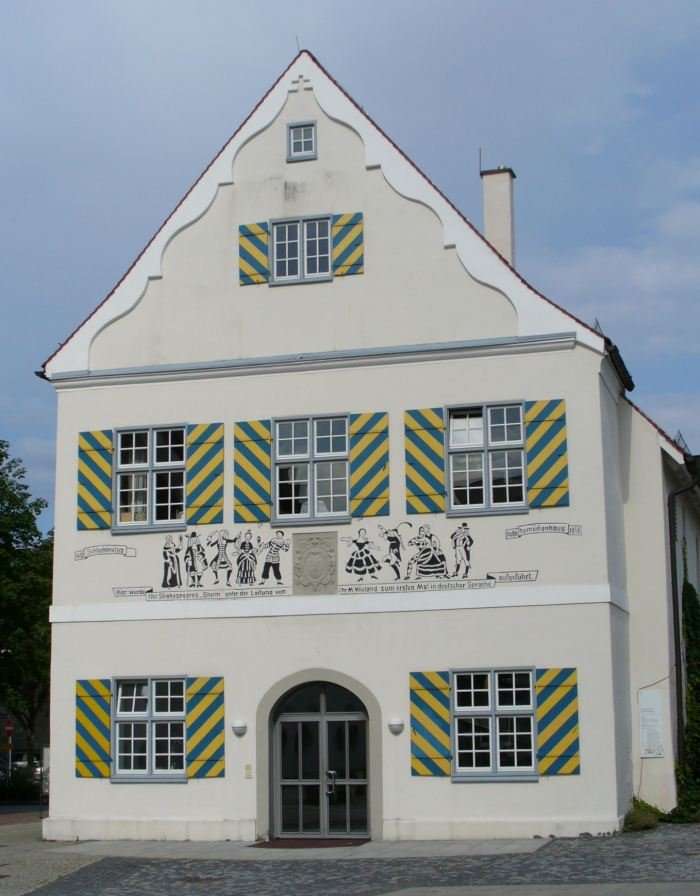
Former Komödienhaus in der Schlachtmetzig where in 1762 The Tempest (Shakespeare), translated by Christoph Martin Wieland, was performed for the first time

For many centuries, Biberach was an Imperial Free City (German: Freie Reichsstadt) in the Holy Roman Empire. In that role it participated in the 1792 Reichstag.

During the Protestant Reformation, Biberach was notable for being — eventually along only with Ravensburg, Augsburg and Dinkelsbühl — a "Mixed Imperial City" (German: Paritätische Reichsstadt) where the Peace of Westphalia caused the establishment of a joint Catholic–Protestant government and administrative system, with equality offices (German: Gleichberechtigung) and a precise and equal distribution between Catholic and Protestant civic officials. This status ended in 1803, when Biberach was annexed by the Margraviate of Baden, soon to become a grand-duchy. In 1806, it was traded to the Kingdom of Württemberg in exchange for the town of Villingen; becoming part of the German Empire on its creation in 1871.

During the French Revolutionary Wars, Biberach and its environs were the site of two sizable battles in 1796 and 1800.

During World War II, two large prisoner-of-war camps were located here, with Oflag V-B for officers, and internment camp Ilag V-B for allied civilians, mainly from the Channel Islands.

== Economy ==
With an unemployment rate of around 3.6 percent and place of business of companies like EnBW, Handtmann, Liebherr, KaVo Dental GmbH, Vollmer and Boehringer Ingelheim, Biberach is a significant industrial location in the southwest of Germany.

=== KaVo ===
KaVo (Kaltenbach & Voigt) is a company producing dental medicine equipment and products like instruments, dental systems, laboratory and equipment for training centres for universities. The head office is in Biberach. In March 2004, Danaher, an American industrial company, took over KaVo. KaVo was later acquired by Envista. The company returned to private ownership as part of the Planmeca Group in January, 2022.

=== Boehringer Ingelheim ===
Boehringer Ingelheim researches, develops and produces pharmaceuticals. Boehringer Ingelheim was founded in Ingelheim am Rhein, Germany, in 1885, where the corporate headquarters are located. There are about 7,500 employees in Biberach.

=== EnBW ===
EnBW means "Energy Baden-Württemberg". Its corporate centre is in Karlsruhe. EnBW is Germany's third largest energy company. In Biberach there are about 900 employees.

=== Liebherr Biberach ===
The beginning of Liebherr Biberach was in 1954. The firm produces many sorts of cranes. 1,700 people and 112 trainees work there. The group's founder, Dr. Hans Liebherr, invented the mobile tower crane in 1949 in Kirchdorf/Iller.

=== Transportation ===
The town has two stations on the Southern Railway (Württemberg) and half-hourly trains to Ulm and Friedrichshafen.

From 1900 to 1964 the main station was also starting point for a narrow gauge railway to Ochsenhausen, which is still in service as a heritage railway from Warthausen to Ochsenhausen.

By road it is connected to Bundesstraße 30, Bundesstraße 465 and Bundesstraße 312 federal roads.

The nearest commercial airports are Memmingen Airport, Stuttgart Airport and Munich Airport.

== Arts and entertainment ==
=== Museums ===
- Braith-Mali-Museum: The museum resides in a building from the 16th century and presents on 2,800 square meters archaeology, history, art and natural history.
- Wieland-Museum: The exhibition explores the life and work of Christoph Martin Wieland. The museum was founded in 1907 and resides in the summer house of Wieland.

=== Film festival ===
Biberach has a film fest for German films which was founded in 1978.

=== "Biberacher Schützenfest" ===
The Biberacher Schützenfest is a historic festival for children and the town. The event is held annually in July and lasts nine days. The name "Schützenfest" derives from the German noun Schütze, meaning marksman. But nowadays, the crossbow competition and the appraisal of the best male and female champion shot (Schützenkönig and -königin) are only small events during the week of the Schützenfest. Other attractions and events during the festival are:

- Street parades
- Fairgrounds
- Historical performances
- Theme park
- Parties in bars, cafès and so on
- Beer tent
- Children's theater (Schützentheater)

=== Christmas Market ===
The annual Christmas market, called "Christkindlesmarkt", which lasts 16 days, is another highlight of the year. Exotic foods from Britain, France, and Italy (presented by the twin cities), kitsch, and beautiful arts and crafts are there to see and buy. People meet to drink mulled wine.

=== Music ===
The church music in Biberach is specially determined by the St.-Martins-Chorknaben Biberach (English: St Martin's Boys’ Choir Biberach).

The rail station of Biberach is mentioned in the Volkslied Auf de schwäbsche Eisebahne.

=== Other events in Biberach ===
- Musiknacht
- Musikfrühling
- Kabarettherbst

== Sports ==
TG Biberach 1847 e. V. is one of the biggest clubs in the region. It has more than 6,000 members and 27 divisions including American football, tennis, chess or volleyball.

IBOT Another important sports festival in Biberach is IBOT, an annual international handball tournament for youth with more than a thousand participants which takes place at Easter.

== Notable people ==
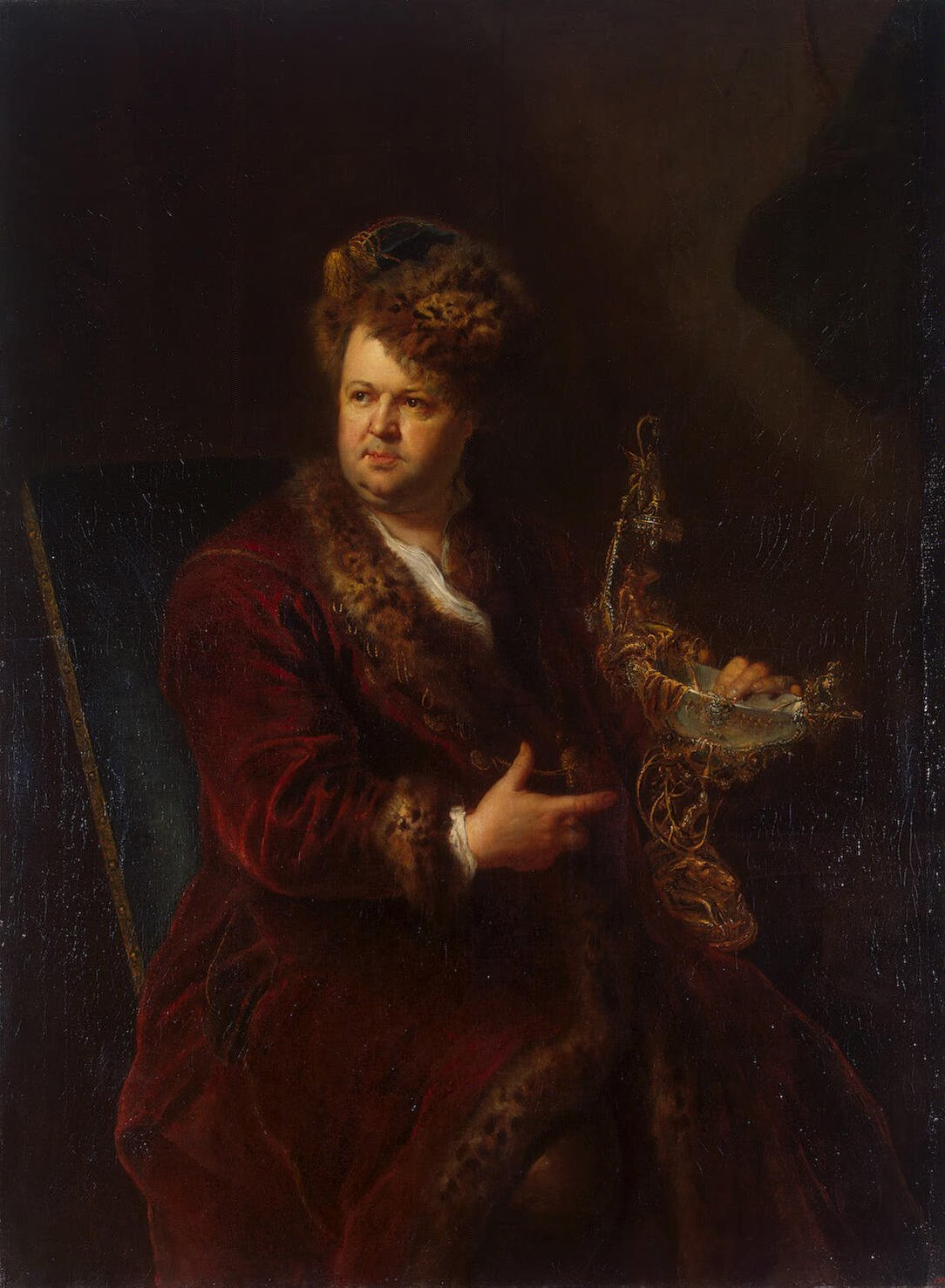
Johann Melchior Dinglinger, c. 1721

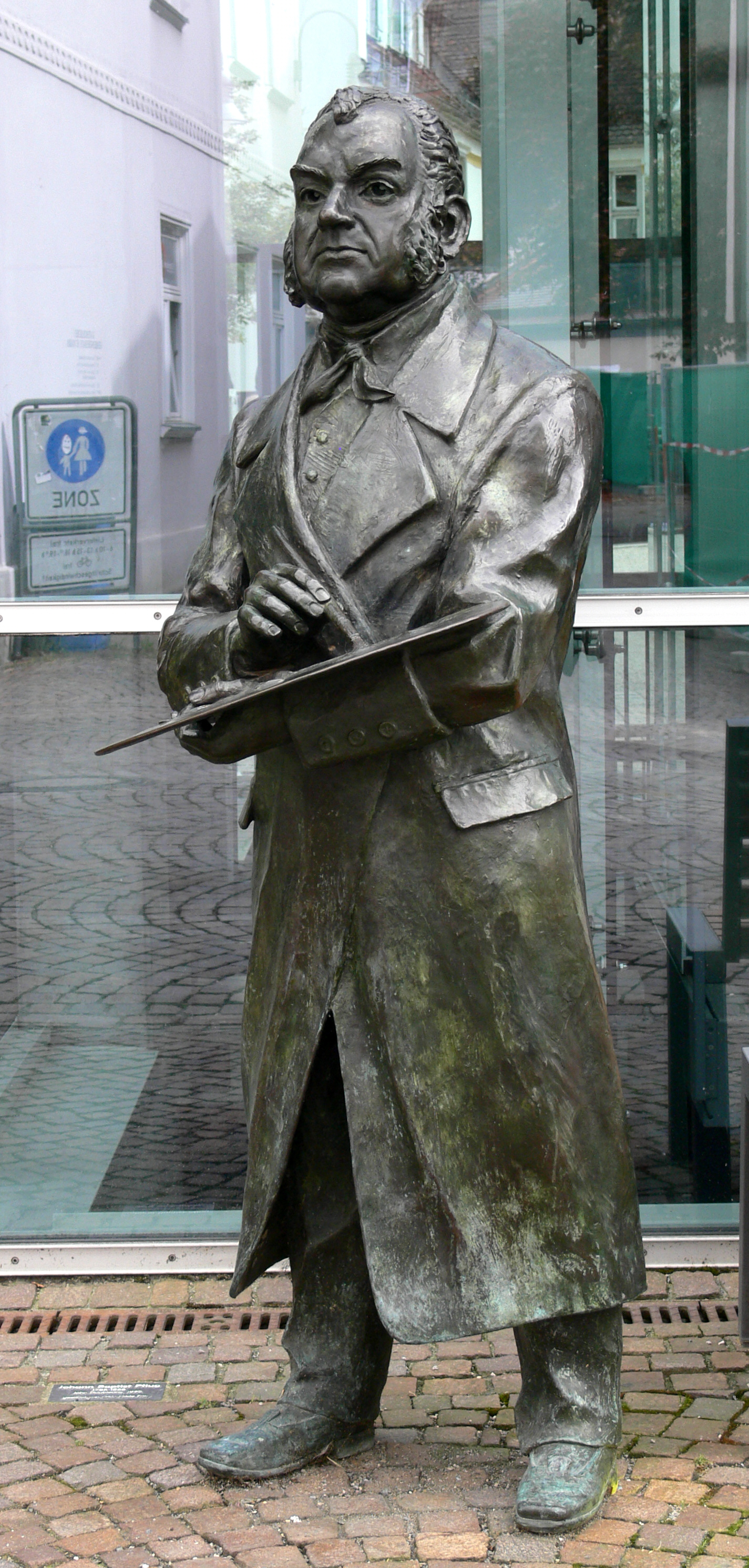
Statue of Johann Baptist Pflug

- Johann Heinrich Schönfeld (1609–1684), Baroque style painter
- Johann Melchior Dinglinger (1664–1731), jeweller at the court of Augustus II the Strong in Dresden
- Lorenz Natter (1705–1763), gem-engraver and medallist
- Felicitas Abt (1741–1783), actress
- Justin Heinrich Knecht (1752–1817), composer, organ player and conductor
- Johann Baptist Pflug (1785–1866), German genre painter
- Johann Friedrich Dieterich (1787-1846), painter and art professor
- Eberhard Emminger (1808–1885), lithographer and landscape painter
- Anton Braith (1836–1905), landscape and animal painter, born and died locally
- Anscar Vonier (1875–1938), abbot of Buckfast Abbey from 1906 on
- Matthias Erzberger (1875–1921), politician of the Centre Party, buried locally
- Hugo Häring (1882–1958), architect and architectural writer
- Alf Bayrle (1900–1982), painter, printmaker and sculptor
- Anton Kutter (1903–1985), film director and screenwriter
- Wolfgang Schad (1935–2022), evolutionary biologist and anthroposophist
- Gisela Erler (born 1946), feminist, entrepreneur and Green Party politician
- Harry Baer (born 1947), actor, producer, author

=== Sport ===
- Ernst Felle (1876–1959), rower and team bronze medallist at the 1900 Summer Olympics
- Dirk Raudies (born 1964), Grand Prix driver and TV sports commentator
- Steffen Deibler (born 1987), swimmer, former world record holder for the 50m. butterfly
- Markus Deibler (born 1990), swimmer
- Loris Karius (born 1993), football goalkeeper, played over 200 games

== Twin towns – sister cities ==
Biberach an der Riß is twinned with:

- Asti, Italy
- Świdnica, Poland
- (Georgia (country)) Telavi, Georgia
- Tendring, England, United Kingdom
- Valence, France

Biberach an der Riß also has friendly relationship with Guernsey.

== See also ==
- Museum Biberach
- Gustav Gerster (company)
- Pestalozzi-Gymnasium Biberach
- Wieland-Gymnasium Biberach
