= Steinberg (Swabian Jura) =

Mountain in Germany

Coordinates: 48°14′04″N 8°55′12″E

Geography
- Location: Zollernalbkreis, Baden-Württemberg, Germany

The Steinberg (German pronunciation: [ˈʃtaɪ̯nˌbɛʁk]) is a mountain in the Swabian Jura in the German state of Baden-Württemberg. It is located in Zollernalbkreis.
