= Lochen (Swabian Jura) =

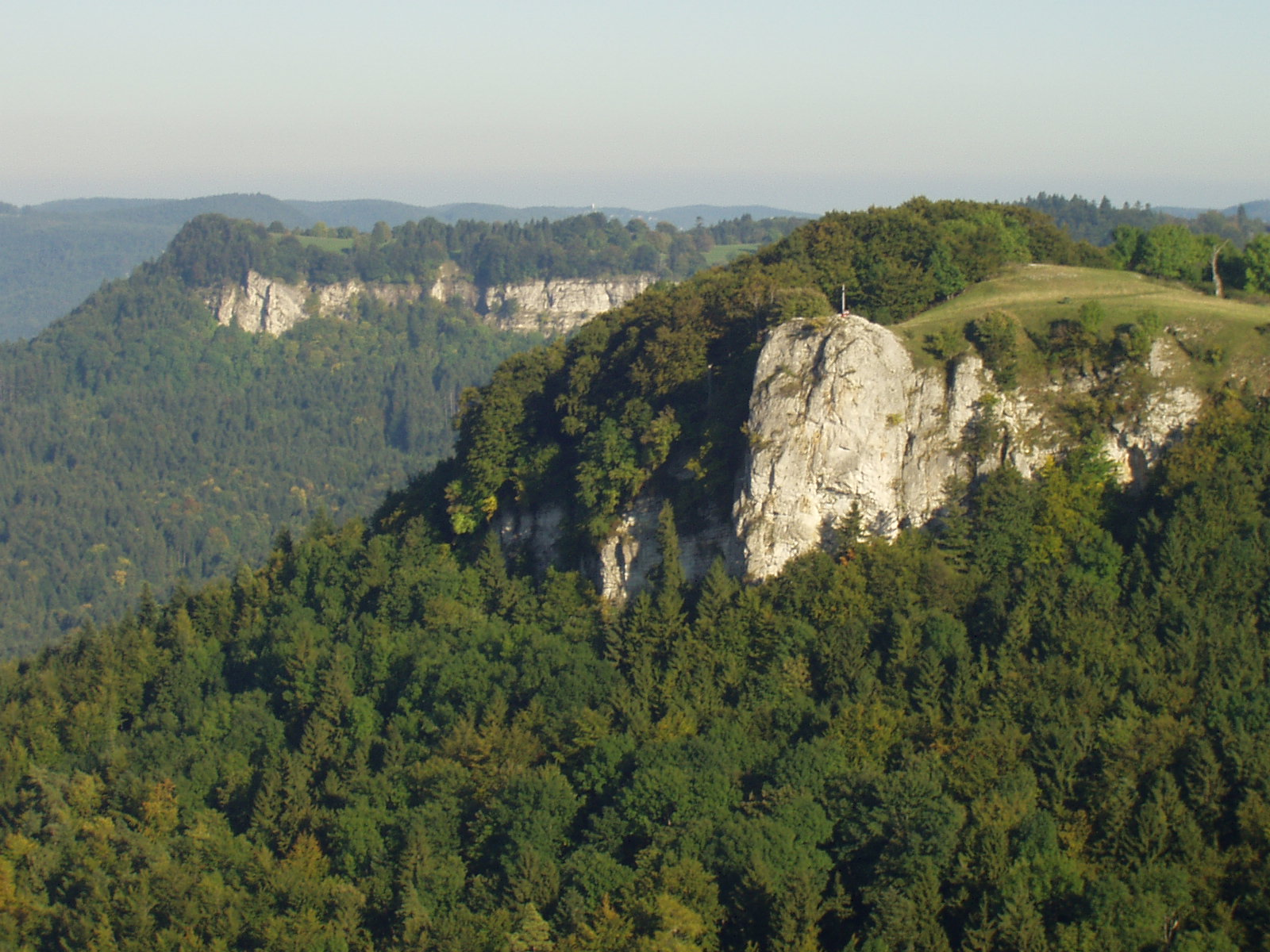

Highest point
- Elevation: 962.9 m (3,159 ft)
- Coordinates: 48°13′10″N 8°50′57″E

Geography
- Location within Germany
- Location: Zollernalbkreis, Baden-Württemberg, Germany

The Lochen is a mountain of Baden-Württemberg, Germany. It is located in Zollernalbkreis, southwestern Germany, and part of the mountain range Swabian Jura. Gerhard Bersu work in 1923 on the Lochen. In 2024 Martin Bartelheim und Marc Heise excavate on the terrain.

until 2025
