= List of clubs in the Landesliga Bayern-Mitte =

This is a List of clubs in the Landesliga Bayern-Mitte, including all clubs and their final placings from the first season in 1963–64 to 2010–11. The league, commonly referred to as the Landesliga Mitte, is the second-highest football league in the state of Bavaria (German: Bayern) and the Bavarian football league system. It is one of three Landesligas in Bavarian football, the sixth tier of the German football league system. Until the introduction of the 3. Liga in 2008 it was the fifth tier.

== Overview ==
Since the formation of the league in 1963, it has served as the tier below the Bayernliga, together with the northern and the southern division of the Landesliga. Originally a tier-four league, it was demoted to tier-five status in 1994, when the Regionalligas were introduced. In 2008, it was then demoted to tier-six status, when the 3. Liga was established.

Originally, the Bezirksligas were the feeder leagues to the Landesliga Süd, of which there were, for the most part, six, two each in Middle Franconia, Upper Palatinate and Lower Bavaria. From 1988, Bezirksoberligas served as feeder leagues instead, having been established as a new tier between the Landesligas and the Bezirksligas. The three leagues below the Landesliga Mitte have since been the Bezirksoberliga Mittelfranken, Bezirksoberliga Oberpfalz and the Bezirksoberliga Niederbayern.

== Clubs and their placings ==
The complete list of clubs and placings in the league since the introduction of the league in 1963:

=== 1963–1988 ===
The first 25 seasons from 1963 to 1988:

Club	S	64	65	66	67	68	69	70	71	72	73	74	75	76	77	78	79	80	81	82	83	84	85	86	87	88
SpVgg Landshut	27	4	10	3	7	7	15		6	15	16					14		9	8	2	B	B	B	B	B	B
SSV Jahn Regensburg ^{5}	11	B	B	1	B	RL	RL	RL	RL	RL	RL	RL	B	2B	2B	B	5	3	3	3	1	B	B	B	B	B
SpVgg Plattling	18	B	B	B	B	6	6	16		10	13	2	8	1	B	B	6	4	4	5	11	11	2	B	B	B
1. FC Amberg ^{2}	18	12	2	15		4	2	4	7	6	2	4	1	B	B	B	B	B	B	B	2	3	3	1	B	B
TSV Vestenbergsgreuth ^{1}	7																		9	12	10	13	4	3	1	B
SpVgg Weiden	12	1	B	R	B	B	B	B	B	B	B	B	B	8	14				10	10	8	6	1	B	B	1
1. FC Miltach	16																							7	4	2
SpVgg Fürth ^{1}	4	RL	RL	RL	RL	RL	RL	RL	RL	RL	RL	RL	2B	2B	2B	2B	2B	2B	2B	2B	2B	B	B	B	B	3
1. FC Nürnberg II	21	5	1	B	B	B	B	B	B	B	B	7	5	4	3	11	7	1	B	B	B	1	B	B	B	4
FC Vilshofen	16											11	12	13	7	1	B	B	1	B	B	B	B	8	3	5
Jahn Forchheim ^{3}	25		17							13	4	5	11	5	4	16		5	6	4	7	7	17		9	6
FC Herzogenaurach	13				11	11	3	1	B	B	B	B	2	3	1	B	1	B	B	9	16		16			7
1. FC Passau	20		11	2	8	1	B	B	B	B	B	B	B	B	B	5	10	8	18		6	12			5	8
TSV Kareth-Lappersdorf	4																									9
FC Aunkirchen	3																									10
SpVgg Ansbach	17																							12	11	11
Post SV Regensburg ^{5}	4																				14			9	6	12
ASV Zirndorf	11	B	B	B	16						9	8	15												14	13
TSV Südwest Nürnberg	12															3	8	10	15		9	8	5	5	7	14
ASV Cham	27	B	7	9	9	15											17				15		7	15		15
DJK Dürnsricht	3																							10	12	16
SC Zwiesel	15						16			3	7	12	7	9	9	13		13	5	15			11	11	8	17
TB Regenstauf	2																								10	18
FSV Bad Windsheim	5																					2	6	2	2	19
SV Sünching	2																								13	20
TSV 04 Schwabach	13	6	16				7	10	15	18													9	13	15	
SK Lauf	6																			6	4	9	14	4	16	
ASV Herzogenaurach	14						4	3	5	1	B	B	B	B	B	2	2	2	12	13	5	14	12	6	17	
TSV Straubing	18	B	B	B	B	B	B	B	2	8	3	10	4	10	2	7	15		2	1	B	B	13		18	
SV Winzer	1																							14		
SV Raigering	3																					10	8	16		
TSV Weißenburg	12					12	12	13	8	7	8	17												17		
BSC Erlangen	16	B	B	B	B	B	B	B	B	B	B	B	B	B	B	B	B	6	13	8	12	4	10	18		
ASV Burglengenfeld	11									9	12	18				4	4	11	14	7	3	5	15			
SpVgg Ruhmannsfelden	3																						18			
FC Ottering	1																					15				
SV Ermreuth	1																					16				
TSV Röttenbach	6																11	7	11	14	13	17				
TuS Grafenwöhr	1																					18				
ASV Neumarkt	20	15						2	1	B	B	1	B	B	B	B	B	B	B	B	17					
SpVgg Deggendorf ^{6}	13	16									6	3	6	11	8	10	12	12	7	11	18					
MTV Fürth	3													6	15					16						
FC Dingolfing	19	7	3	6	12	17		14	17						10	15				17						
SC Teublitz	7											6	9	7	11	8	16			18						
TSV Altenfurt	11											9	10	15	6	12	14	14	16							
TuS Feuchtwangen	2												18						17							
FC Schwandorf	10	B	B	B	B	B	B	7	3	4	11	16				9	3	15								
TuS Rosenberg	9	8	4	4	2	2	14	17									13	16								
SpVgg Vohenstrauß	9				4	3	1	B	B	B	B	B	3	2	5	6	9	17								
SV Weiden	1																	18								
1. FC Viechtach	3					9	17										18									
TSV Roth	7								4	2	1	B	14	14	13	17										
ESV Regensburg	4												13	12	12	18										
TSV Lindberg	1														16											
TSV Pressath	4								16		14				17											
SpVgg Erlangen	8	9	5	10	6	8	9	18							18											
FC Maxhütte-Haidhof	8	10	19				13	9	9	11	15			16												
SV Saal	7	11	13	11	14	13	18							17												
TV Parsberg	1													18												
ATSV Erlangen	1												16													
ETSV Landshut	2												17													
ESV Nürnberg-West	10	2	8	7	1	B	11	6	14	12	10	15														
TSV Neustadt	1											13														
TSV Langenzenn	2										5	14														
FC Stein	10	3	6	5	3	5	10	11	12	5	17															
SV 73 Nürnberg-Süd ^{7}	9				10	14	5	12	13	14	18															
Regensburger TS	3							5	11	16																
SV Laufamholz	3							8	10	17																
SV Pocking	1								18																	
Sturm Hauzenberg	5			8	5	10	8	15																		
TuSpO Roßtal	3			14	13	16																				
1. SC Feucht	5					18																				
TSV Johannis Nürnberg	3	B	9	13	15																					
FC Eging	1				17																					
TV Erlangen	3	17		12	18																					
Glück-Auf Wackersdorf	4		12	16																						
1. FC Hersbruck	3	14	14	17																						
1. FC Schwarzenfeld	2	18		18																						
ASV Nürnberg-Süd ^{7}	2	13	15																							
ASV Fürth	1		18																							

=== 1988–2012 ===
The last 24 seasons from 1988 to 2012:

Club	S	89	90	91	92	93	94	95	96	97	98	99	00	01	02	03	04	05	06	07	08	09	10	11	12
SpVgg Greuther Fürth ^{1}	4	2	3	1	B	B	B	R	R	R	2B	2B	2B	2B	2B	2B	2B	2B	2B	2B	2B	2B	2B	2B	2B
SSV Jahn Regensburg ^{5}	11	7	1	B	B	B	B	B	B	2	3	1	B	R	R	R	2B	R	R	B	R	3L	3L	3L	3L
1. FC Nürnberg II	21	6	6	2	6	10	6	7	4	8	2	B	B	B	B	B	B	B	B	B	B	R	R	R	R
SpVgg Greuther Fürth II	1													1	B	B	B	B	B	B	B	R	R	R	R
FSV Erlangen-Bruck	4																	5	3	3	1	B	B	B	B
SV Seligenporten	4																	6	6	4	2	B	B	B	B
SC Eltersdorf	10														12	8	7	8	5	11	15	13	5	1	B
SpVgg Landshut	27	B	5	7	2	B	B	B	B	B	B	B	B	4	2	1	B	3	4	5	4	2	4	3	1
SV Schalding-Heining	11												5	10	5	11	4	13	10	2	5	1	B	B	2
SSV Jahn Regensburg II ^{5}	6															B	B	B	B	14	8	11	3	2	3
DJK Ammerthal	3																						7	7	4
SpVgg G-W Deggendorf ^{6}	6																17		17			9	9	8	5
SpVgg Hankofen	8														13	7	9	9	15		16			4	6
ASV Neumarkt	20			15						4	4	3	1	B	B	3	5	2	11	12	6	3	13	12	7
Jahn Forchheim ^{3}	25	8	8	7	13	12	1	B	B	B	B	B	B							19				13	8
1. FC Bad Kötzting	16			10	3	8	10	12	5	14	15	5	2	9	8	5	1	B	B	B	B	B	B	11	9
FSV Erlangen-Bruck II	3																						14	14	10
TSV Neustadt/Aisch	15								13	10	16		15	14	10	13	13	10	18		9	6	2	5	11
Dergah Spor Nürnberg	1																								12
ASV Cham	27				7	11	9	15	7	12	14	14	14	13	3	9	6	12	12	8	18				13
FC Ergolding	1																								14
SV Buckenhofen	1																								15
TSV Bad Abbach	2																							6	16
SpVgg Ansbach	17	9	10	6	12	5	12	10	16		5	2	B	B	R	B	B	B	8	1	B	B	B	9	17
SV Etzentricht	6																			7	11	12	11	10	18
Freier TuS Regensburg	14										13	13	9	6	11	12	12	7	2	6	7	4	1	B	19
SpVgg Weiden ^{8}	12	B	B	B	B	B	3	2	B	B	B	B	B	B	B	B	B	B	1	B	B	B	R	R	
FC Amberg ^{2}	7																16		7	15	13	8	10	15	
FC Tegernheim	4																	16				10	15	16	
DJK Vilzing	10													11	14	14	3	4	16		3	5	8	17	
SpVgg Weiden II	2																						12	18	
FC Dingolfing	19														18		8	14	14	9	10	7	6	19	
TV Schierling	1																						16		
SG Quelle Fürth	11	12	13	9	14		7	1	B	R	B	B	R	B	B	B	2	1	B	17		14	17		
SV 73 Nürnberg-Süd ^{1}	9																					15	18		
ASC Simbach	1																					16			
ASV Vach	15							13	8	9	9	4	4	3	6	4	11	11	9	13	12	17			
1. SC Feucht	5								12	1	B	B	B	B	B	B	R	R	B	B	14	18			
SpVgg Kirchdorf	3																		13	10	17				
1. FC Schnaitach	3																15	15		16					
1. FC Miltach	16	4	4	3	4	7	13	6	10	16		9	11	16						18					
1. FC Passau	20	3	2	4	1	B	B	B	B	B	B	B	B	12	4	2	B	B	B	20					
SC 04 Schwabach	3									3	1	B	B	B	B	B	B	B	19						
FV Wendelstein	3															10	14		20						
ASV Zirndorf	11	15													7	6	10	17							
ETSV Landshut	2																	18							
TSV Kareth-Lappersdorf	4	17		13													18								
SV Neusorg	5										12	8	16		9	15									
FC Beilngries	1															16									
SV Hutthurm	8								9	6	10	7	7	8	15	17									
SV Perlesreut	1															18									
SG Post/Süd Regensburg ^{5}	11	10	8	5	11	9	5	3	1	B	B	B	3	5	1										
Linde Schwandorf	6							14	17			12	8	2	16										
SC Luhe-Wildenau	5									15	17		12	7	17										
Glück-Auf Wackersdorf	4												10	15											
TSV Rotthalmünster	1													17											
TSV Straubing	18									5	8	11	13	18											
SV Riedelhütte ^{4}	3										6	6	6												
BSC Erlangen	16				8	2	4	4	15	13	7	10	17												
TSV Ergoldsbach	1												18												
TSV Uehlfeld	1											15													
TuS Landshut-Berg	4							9	3	17		16													
DJK Schwabach	1											17													
SV Landau/Isar	6				15			8	6	7	11	18													
ESV Rangierbahnhof Nürnberg	4							11	14	11	18														
FC Schwandorf	10								11	18															
TSV 04 Schwabach	13					3	8	5	2																
TSV Velden	1								18																
1. FC Amberg ^{2}	18	B	B	B	10	4	2	B																	
SpVgg Plattling	18	1	B	B	B	1	B	16																	
TSV Katzwang	3					13	14	17																	
FC Vilshofen	16	5	11	12	5	6	11	18																	
FC Furth im Wald	1						15																		
SpVgg Deggendorf ^{6}	13	14					16																		
TSV Weißenburg	12		12	11	9	14																			
TSV Waldkirchen	1					15																			
VfB Regensburg	1					16																			
Detag Wernberg	2		15		16																				
TSV Südwest Nürnberg	2	18		14																					
ASV Auerbach	2		9	16																					
FC Aunkirchen	3	11	14																						
TV Freyung	1		16																						
SpVgg Ruhmannsfelden	2	13	17																						
TSV Pressath	4	16																							
FC Herzogenaurach	13	19																							

=== Key ===
Symbol	Key
B	Bundesliga
RL 2B	Regionalliga Süd (1963–74): 2. Bundesliga (1974–present)
3L	3. Liga
R	Regionalliga Süd (1994–present)
B	Bayernliga
1	League champions
Place	League
Blank	Played at a league level below this league

- S = No of seasons in league (as of 2011–12)

=== Notes ===
- ^{1} In 1996, the SpVgg Fürth and TSV Vestenbergsgreuth merged to form SpVgg Greuther Fürth.
- ^{2} In 1995, 1. FC Amberg was declared bankrupt and folded. A new club, the FC Amberg, was formed, initially within the TV Amberg.
- ^{3} In 2000, Jahn Forchheim withdrew from the Bayernliga to the lower amateur leagues.
- ^{4} In 2000, SV Riedelhütte withdrew from the league.
- ^{5} In 1988, the Post SV Regensburg merged with TSG Süd Regensburg to form SG Post/Süd Regensburg. In 2002, SG Post/Süd Regensburg joined SSV Jahn Regensburg to become Jahn Regensburg II.
- ^{6} In 2003 the SpVgg Grün-Weiss Deggendorf was formed through a merger of SpVgg Deggendorf and SV Grün-Weiss Deggendorf.
- ^{7} In 1967, the ASV Nürnberg-Süd merged with the TSV Nürnberg to form SV 73 Nürnberg-Süd.
- ^{8} In 2011, SpVgg Weiden declared insolvency in the Regionalliga and was relegated to the Bezirksoberliga Oberpfalz.
