= Landesliga Bayern-Mitte (2012) =

- Founded: 2012
- Country: Germany
- State: Bavaria
- Number of clubs: 18
- Level on pyramid: Level 6
- Promotion to: Bayernliga
- Relegation to: Bezirksliga
- Current champions: SpVgg SV Weiden (2021–22)

The Landesliga Bayern-Mitte (English: State league Bavaria-Central) is currently the sixth tier of the German football league system in central and eastern Bavaria and the third tier of the Bavarian football league system.

It is one of five Landesligas in Bavaria, the other four being the Landesliga Südwest, Landesliga Nordost, Landesliga Nordwest and Landesliga Südost. The league champion automatically qualifies for the Bayernliga, the runners-up need to compete with the runners-up of the other four Landesligas and a number of Bayernliga teams for another promotion spot.

The league replaced the Landesliga Bayern-Nord and the Landesliga Bayern-Mitte at this level, both formed in 1963 and disbanded in 2012. The new Landesliga Mitte covers predominantly the Upper Palatinate but clubs from Middle Franconia, Upper Franconia and Lower Bavaria based in the border region to Upper Palatinate also compete. However, the league boundaries can be slightly adjusted season-by-season by the Bavarian Football Association. It differs in that the old league of the same name (which existed until 2012) completely covered the regions of Upper Palatinate, Middle Franconia and Lower Bavaria.

== History ==
=== Formation ===
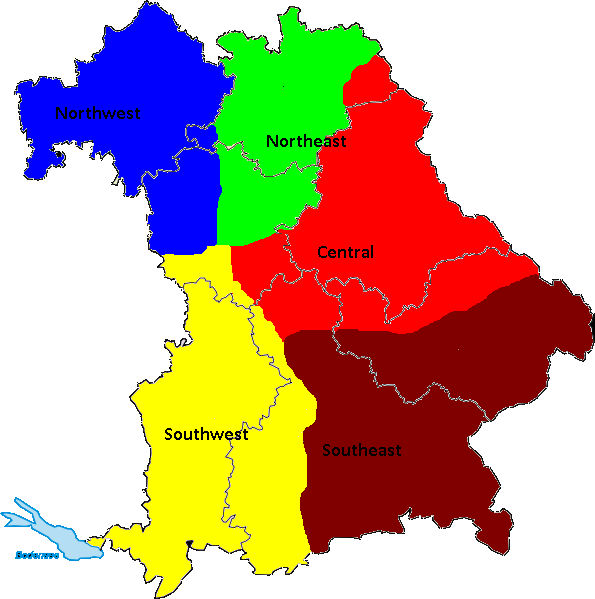
The Landesligas from 2012 onwards.

The Bavarian Football Association carried out drastic changes to the league system at the end of the 2011–12 season. With the already decided introduction of the Regionalliga Bayern from 2012–13, it also placed two Bayernligas below the new league as the new fifth tier of the German league system, splitting the previously single division league into a northern and a southern group. Below those, five Landesligas instead of the existing three were set, which were geographically divided to limit travel and increase the number of local derbies.

Clubs from three different league tiers were able to qualify for the new league. From the Landesliga level, the clubs placed ninth to 15th had the opportunity to qualify for the Bayernliga through play-offs. Those clubs who failed to qualify for the Bayernliga were grouped in the Landesliga. The Landesliga clubs placed 16th, 17th and 18th automatically went to the Landesliga. The Bezirksoberliga (BOL) champions also had the chance to qualify for the Bayernliga. Those clubs who failed went to the Landesliga, alongside the BOL teams placed second to sixth. The teams placed seventh in Upper Palatinate, seventh to twelfth in Lower Franconia and seventh to tenths in Lower Bavaria entered a play-off with the Bezirksliga champions for the remaining Landesliga spots. The league, in its inaugural season, played with 18 clubs.

The league started out with 18 clubs in its inaugural season, the clubs coming from the following leagues:

- From the Landesliga Bayern-Mitte (VI): ASV Cham, TSV Bad Abbach, SpVgg Ansbach, Freier TuS Regensburg, 1. FC Bad Kötzting
- From the Bezirksoberliga Mittelfranken (VII): 1. SC Feucht, SC 04 Schwabach, TSG 08 Roth, SV Seligenporten II
- From the Bezirksoberliga Oberpfalz (VII): FC Tegernheim, DJK Vilzing, TSV Kareth-Lappersdorf, VfB Bach, Fortuna Regensburg
- From the Bezirksoberliga Niederbayern (VII): SpVgg Ruhmannsfelden, TV Schierling, TSV Bogen
- From the Bezirksliga Oberpfalz Nord (VIII): 1. FC Schwarzenfeld

=== Seasons ===
The opening game of the new league took place on 20 July 2012 when FC Tegernheim hosted VfB Bach and won 4-0. At the end of the 2012–13 season, league champions TSV Bogen were directly promoted while runners-up DJK Vilzing failed to earn promotion via the promotion round. At the other end of the table, SV Seligenporten II, 1. FC Schwarzenfeld and SC 04 Schwabach were directly relegated, while Freier TuS Regensburg and TSG 08 Roth had to enter the promotion/relegation round with the Bezirksliga runners-up where both lost to ASV Burglengenfeld. For the 2013–14 season four clubs were promoted to the league, SpVgg Lam, ASV Burglengenfeld, SC Ettmannsdorf, and SV Burgweinting. Apart from these four sides the league also received SV Mitterteich who moved to the Mitte division from the Nordost after the 2012–13 season while, in turn, SpVgg Ansbach was moved from Mitte to the Nordwest division.

The 2019–20 season was interrupted by the coronavirus disease pandemic in Germany that began in March 2020. It was later suspended until 31 August, forcing a cancellation of the 2020–21 season as the BFV approved a resumption of the preceding one, which was curtailed in May 2021.

== Modus ==
The league is played in a home-and-away format with the league champion being directly promoted to the Bayernliga. The runners-up enters a promotion round with the other four Landesliga runners-up and the Bayernliga teams placed just above the direct relegation ranks, 15th and 16th in the south and 15th in the north, for additional spots in this league. The bottom three teams from the Landesliga are directly relegated to the Bezirksligas. The teams placed 15th, 16th and 17th have to play-off with the Bezirksliga runners-up for their place in the Landesliga.

== Top-three of the Landesliga ==
The following teams have finished in the top-three in the league:

Season	Champions	Runners-up	Third
2012–13	TSV Bogen	DJK Vilzing	ASV Cham
2013–14	1. FC Bad Kötzting	**DJK Vilzing**	TSV Bad Abbach
2014–15	SpVgg Ruhmannsfelden	**ASV Burglengenfeld**	ASV Neumarkt
2015–16	DJK Ammerthal	Fortuna Regensburg	1. FC Bad Kötzting
2016–17	DJK Gebenbach	SV Donaustauf	ASV Cham
2017–18	SSV Jahn Regensburg II	TSV Waldkirchen	FC Sturm Hauzenberg
2018–19	SV Donaustauf	**ASV Cham**	SpVgg SV Weiden
2019–21	ASV Neumarkt	SpVgg SV Weiden	SV Fortuna Regensburg
2021–22	SpVgg SV Weiden	SV Fortuna Regensburg	SC Ettmannsdorf

- Promoted teams in **bold**.
- The 2019–20 season was suspended and later extended to 2021, when the top three were ranked on a points per game basis.

== League placings ==
The complete list of clubs and placings in the league since its inception in 2012:

Club	13	14	15	16	17	18	19	20	21	22	23
DJK Vilzing	2	2	**B**	**B**	**B**	**B**	**B**	**B**	**B**	**B**	**R**
DJK Ammerthal	**B**	**B**	**B**	**1**	**B**	**B**	**B**	**B**	**B**	**B**	**B**
SpVgg Ansbach	4	**1**^{∞}	**B**	**1**^{∞}	**B**	**B**	**B**	**B**	**B**	**B**	**R**
DJK Gebenbach				14	**1**	**B**	**B**	**B**	**B**	**B**	**B**
SSV Jahn Regensburg II	**B**	**B**	**B**	**B**	**B**	**1**	**B**	**B**	**B**	**B**	**B**
SV Donaustauf					2	9	**1**	**B**	**B**	**B**	**B**
ASV Cham	3	8	4	5	3	4	2	**B**	**B**	**B**	**B**
ASV Neumarkt	**B**	**B**	3	**1**^{#}	**B**	**B**	**B**	1	**1**	**B**	**B**
1. SC Feucht	5	14	**1**^{#}	**B**	**B**	3^{#}	2^{#}	1^{#}	**1**^{#}	**B**	**B**
SpVgg SV Weiden	**1**^{#}	**B**	**B**	**B**	**B**	**B**	3	2	2	**1**	**B**
SV Fortuna Regensburg	13	16	9	1	4	5	5	5	3	2	x
SC Ettmannsdorf		7	11	9	10	15	8	3	4	3	x
SC 04 Schwabach	17				9^{#}	7^{#}	4^{#}	3^{#}	2^{#}	3^{#}	x^{#}
SV Neukirchen b. Hl. Blut					14	7	14	14	15	4	x
TSV Bogen	**1**	**B**	**B**	**B**	**B**	8	10^{†}	15	11	5	x
FC Sturm Hauzenberg				6	9	3	6	12^{†}	11^{†}	6	x
TSV Seebach					16			6	5	7	x
TSV Kareth-Lappersdorf	11	15		10	13	14	13	4	6	8	x
SpVgg Osterhofen				8	15					9	x
1. FC Bad Kötzting	8	**1**	**B**	3	5	10	4	9	7	10	x
FC Amberg										11	x
VfB Straubing								10	14	12	x
SV Mitterteich	13^{#}	6	8	13	13^{#}	9^{#}	6^{#}	11^{#}	9^{#}	13^{#}	x^{#}
FC Tegernheim	12	9	5	15		13	12	8	8	13	x
1. FC Passau	3^{†}	15^{†}					11	10^{†}	8^{†}	14	
TV Aiglsbach						18^{†}		12	9	15^{†}	
SpVgg Lam		13	12	16				16	13	15	x
ASV Burglengenfeld		5	2	**B**	6	6	10	7	10	16	x
Wacker Neutraubling										17	
TSV Bad Abbach	9	3	6	11	7	11	7	13	12	18	
BSC Woffenbach								11	16	19^{#}	
SV TuS/DJK Grafenwöhr								17	17		
SpVgg Pfreimd							17	18	18		x
TSV Waldkirchen	9^{†}	4^{†}	10	12	8	2	9	18^{†}	18^{†}		x
SV Etzenricht	3^{#}	4	14	7	12	16	15				
VfB Bach	6	17					16				
SV Hutthurm			7	4	11	12	18				
1. FC Schwarzenfeld	18					17					
SV Raigering						18					
SpVgg Ruhmannsfelden	7	10	**1**	**B**	17						
SV Sorghof					18						
TV Schierling	10	11	13	17							
SV Seligenporten II	15		12^{#}	17^{#}							
ATSV Kelheim				18							
SpVgg GW Deggendorf	**B**	12	15								x
TSV Langquaid			16								
SV Vilseck			17								
SC Regensburg			18								
SV Burgweinting		18									
TSG 08 Roth	14										
Freier TuS Regensburg	16										
TB 03 Roding											x

- Placings for 2020 were based on the table at the point of suspension during the coronavirus pandemic. Final placings were after the curtailment of the resumed 2019–20 season in 2021.

=== Key ===
Symbol	Key
**R**	Regionalliga Bayern
**B**	Bayernliga
**1**	League champions
Place	League
Place^{†}	Played in the Southeast division that season.
Place^{#}	Played in the Northeast division that season.
Place^{∞}	Played in the Northwest division that season.
Blank	Played at a league level below this league
