= Lutz Pfannenstiel =

German footballer (born 1973)

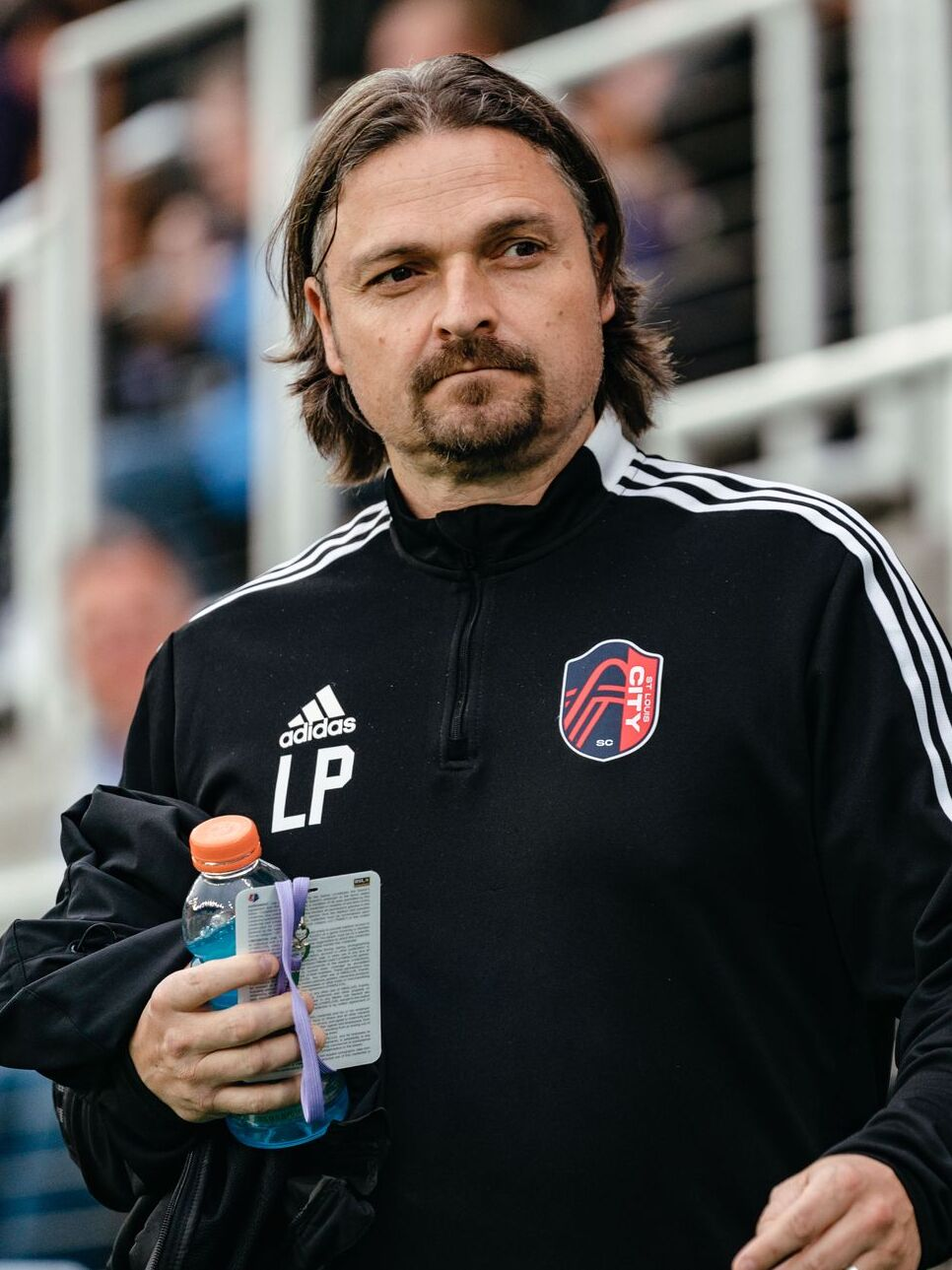
- Pfannenstiel with St. Louis City SC in 2022

Personal information
- Full name: Lutz Pfannenstiel
- Date of birth: 12 May 1973 (age 53)
- Place of birth: Zwiesel, West Germany
- Height: 1.87 m (6 ft 2 in)
- Position: Goalkeeper

Team information
- Current team: Aberdeen (sporting director)

Youth career
- 1979–1989: SC Zwiesel
- 1989–1991: FC Vilshofen

Senior career*
| Years | Team | Apps | (Gls) |
| 1991–1993 | 1. FC Bad Kötzting | 68 | (0) |
| 1993–1994 | Penang FA | 12 | (0) |
| 1994–1995 | Wimbledon | 0 | (0) |
| 1995–1997 | Nottingham Forest | 0 | (0) |
| 1996–1997 | → Orlando Pirates (loan) | 7 | (0) |
| 1997 | TPV | 8 | (0) |
| 1997 | FC Haka | 0 | (0) |
| 1998–1999 | Wacker Burghausen | 14 | (0) |
| 1999–2000 | Geylang United | 46 | (0) |
| 2001 | Dunedin Technical | 18 | (0) |
| 2001–2002 | → Bradford Park Avenue (loan) | 1 | (0) |
| 2001–2002 | Huddersfield Town | 0 | (0) |
| 2002 | Dunedin Technical | 18 | (0) |
| 2002 | ASV Cham | 12 | (0) |
| 2002–2003 | → Bradford Park Avenue (loan) | 14 | (0) |
| 2003 | Dunedin Technical | 18 | (0) |
| 2003 | → Bærum SK (loan) | 13 | (0) |
| 2004 | Calgary Mustangs | 28 | (0) |
| 2004–2006 | Otago United | 36 | (0) |
| 2006–2007 | Vllaznia Shkodër | 14 | (0) |
| 2007 | Bentonit Ijevan | 12 | (0) |
| 2007 | Bærum SK | 9 | (0) |
| 2007 | Vancouver Whitecaps | 4 | (0) |
| 2008 | Hermann Aichinger | 24 | (0) |
| 2008–2009 | Flekkerøy IL | 14 | (0) |
| 2009 | Manglerud Star | 11 | (0) |
| 2009–2011 | Ramblers | 45 | (0) |
| Total | | 477 | (0) |

International career
| 1986–1987 | Germany U-17 | 5 | (0) |

Managerial career
- 2007: Bentonit Ijevan
- 2008: Flekkerøy IL (assistant)
- 2008–2009: Cuba (assistant)
- 2009–2010: Ramblers
- 2009–2010: Namibia (assistant)
- * Club domestic league appearances and goals

Lutz Pfannenstiel (born 12 May 1973) is a German football executive and former professional goalkeeper, coach, and scout who is currently the sporting director of Scottish Premiership club Aberdeen. He holds the record as the first footballer to play in each of the six recognized continental associations.

Since 2010, he has been a football analyst on various television networks — including ZDF, BBC, CNN, ORF, SRF, DAZN, Eurosport, and ESPN, where he currently covers the Bundesliga with Derek Rae.

Pfannenstiel was appointed sporting director for St. Louis City SC ahead of their entry into MLS in 2023. Pffanenstiel was fired as sporting director on 25 August 2025.

== Playing career ==
Born in Zwiesel, Bavaria, Pfannenstiel represented Germany at under-17 level. When he was 19, Bayern Munich approached him, but he turned them down, believing that he would have more of an opportunity at smaller clubs.

Pfannenstiel played for 25 different clubs all around the world during his career, including stints in Germany, Malaysia, England, New Zealand, Singapore, United States, Brazil, South Africa, Finland, Canada, Namibia, Norway, Armenia and Albania. After signing for Hermann Aichinger in Brazil, he became the first professional to have played in all six FIFA confederations. Throughout his career, Pfannenstiel played over 500 professional games.

== Coaching career ==
In April 2008, Pfannenstiel became the assistant coach for Reinhold Fanz, coaching the Cuba national football team. He signed a contract in January 2009 to be the player-goalkeeper coach for Manglerud Star. In September 2009, Pfannenstiel left Norway and Europe to sign with Namibian club Ramblers as player-coach and sporting director, in addition to working as goalkeeping coach of the Namibia national football team.

He also works as a coaching instructor for FIFA and the German Football Association (DFB), educating coaches all over the world.

== Post-retirement ==
Since his retirement from active footballing, he has also pursued television and writing.

He wrote his biography Unhaltbar – Meine Abenteuer als Welttorhüter; the book was released on 1 October 2009. and the UK bestseller The unstoppable keeper released in August 2014.

In 2011, Pfannenstiel also founded Global United FC, an international, non-profit, registered association in Germany dedicated to protecting the environment and raising awareness for climate change issues.

== Media career ==
During the 2010, 2014 and 2018 FIFA World Cups, Pfannenstiel worked as a pundit for the German television station ZDF, alongside fellow goalkeeper Oliver Kahn. He works as an expert for BBC World and CNN as well as Eurosport.

== Executive career ==
From February 2011 to 2018, Pfannenstiel was the Head Director of International Relations & Scouting for the Bundesliga club TSG Hoffenheim. From 2018 to 2020, he worked with Fortuna Düsseldorf as their managing sporting director.

=== St. Louis City SC ===
Pfannenstiel was appointed as sporting director for Major League Soccer expansion club St. Louis City SC in 2020, tasked with building the team’s roster and footballing identity ahead of their inaugural 2023 season.

Under his leadership, the club earned widespread praise for its high‑pressing style and successful debut campaign, finishing atop the Western Conference regular season standings.

Following a highly successful inaugural 2023 season and a disappointing 2024 campaign, Pfannenstiel came under scrutiny in 2025 for his decisions regarding head coach appointments. In November 2024, the club hired Olof Mellberg in a multi-year contract. Despite assurances that Mellberg aligned with the club's aggressive playing philosophy, St. Louis City SC posted a 2–8–5 record under his leadership and scored only 11 goals, ranking as the second-worst offense in Major League Soccer.

Pfannenstiel and club president Diego Gigliani publicly took responsibility for the appointment, stating that Mellberg failed to maintain the team’s established style of play and that his dismissal was "about more than results".

Criticism followed from fans and local media, with supporters arguing that Pfannenstiel misaligned the coach's tactical philosophy with the roster. Fan forums and social media discussions described the statement following the release of Mellberg as contradicting public statements made only months earlier, and accused him of insufficient vetting during the coaching search.

St. Louis City SC parted ways with Pfannenstiel on 25 August 2025. He was subsequently appointed sporting director by Aberdeen.

== Legal and health issues ==
While playing football in Singapore, Pfannenstiel was accused of match-fixing and jailed for 101 days. He was later cleared of the charges. During his time in New Zealand, he kidnapped a penguin in Otago and kept it in his bathtub, only to send it back when the president of Otago United warned him he could face deportation if caught. Pfannenstiel was never charged for this incident.

Pfannenstiel stopped breathing three times after a collision with Clayton Donaldson while playing for Bradford Park Avenue against Harrogate Town in a Northern Premier League match on 26 December 2002. The injury was so serious that the referee, Jon Moss, abandoned the match. Bradford Park Avenue were leading 2–1 at the time of the incident.

== See also ==
- Journeyman (sports)
