= 2014–15 Bayernliga =

Bayernliga
- Season: 2014–15
- Champions: Nord: Viktoria Aschaffenburg; Süd: TSV Rain am Lech
- Promoted: Viktoria Aschaffenburg; TSV Rain am Lech; FC Amberg
- Relegated: SV Memmelsdorf; TSV Neudrossenfeld; FSV Erlangen-Bruck; SpVgg Ansbach; DJK Ammerthal; SB/DJK Rosenheim; SpVgg Unterhaching II; SV Raisting; SpVgg Landshut; 1. FC Bad Kötzting
- Top goalscorer: Nord: Florian Pieper (25 goals); Süd: Sebastian Kinzel (51 goals)
- Highest attendance: Nord: 2,165; Süd: 2,400
- Lowest attendance: Nord: 49; Süd: 30
- Total attendance: Nord: 104,659; Süd: 95,972
- Average attendance: Nord: 341; Süd: 283

The 2014–15 season of the Bayernliga, the second highest association football league in Bavaria, was the seventh season of the league at tier five (V) of the German football league system and the 70th season overall since establishment of the league in 1945. The regular season started on 11 July 2014 and finished on 23 May 2015, followed by relegation play-off games. The league season was interrupted by a winter break, which lasted from late November 2014 to 28 February 2015.

== Modus ==
The northern division of the Bayernliga consists of 18 clubs while the southern division consists of 19. Clubs in each division will play each other in a home-and-away format with no league games played between clubs from different divisions during the regular season. The champions of each division were directly promoted to the Regionalliga, subject to fulfilling the licensing regulations of the later with no overall Bayernliga championship game being played between the two league winners. The runners-up of each league takes part in promotion round with the 16th and 15th placed clubs in the Regionalliga. The four clubs play for one more spot in the Regionalliga in 2015–16 unless the Regionalliga champion wins promotion to the 3. Liga, in which case two spots in the league may become available. Should the champions or runners-up not receive approval for a Regionalliga licence the direct promotion and play off spots will be passed down to the highest placed club with a licence approval.

The bottom two teams in the southern division and the bottom team in the northern division are directly relegated while the 15th, 16th and 17th placed teams from both divisions as well as the 14th placed team with the lesser points take part in the relegation playoffs with the five Landesliga runners-up.

Seven Bayernliga clubs applied for a Regionalliga licence for 2015–16, these being FC Pipinsried and TSV Rain am Lech from the southern division and Viktoria Aschaffenburg, FC Amberg, SpVgg SV Weiden, TSV Großbardorf and SpVgg Bayern Hof from the northern division, with all of them having their application approved.

== 2014–15 Standings ==
=== Bayernliga Nord ===
The division featured four new clubs with TSV Neudrossenfeld and SpVgg Ansbach having been promoted from the Landesliga while SpVgg Bayern Hof and Viktoria Aschaffenburg had been relegated from the Regionalliga.

Pos	Team	Pld	W	D	L	GF	GA	GD	Pts	Promotion, qualification or relegation
1	Viktoria Aschaffenburg (C, P)	34	24	7	3	98	33	+65	79	Promotion to Regionalliga Bayern
2	FC Amberg (P)	34	22	7	5	76	30	+46	73	Qualification to promotion playoffs
3	SpVgg Jahn Forchheim	34	18	7	9	62	48	+14	61	
4	SpVgg SV Weiden	34	18	6	10	64	34	+30	60	
5	TSV Großbardorf	34	16	11	7	45	26	+19	59 (Note: Gro 1–0 Jahn; Jahn 0–1 Gro)	
6	Jahn Regensburg II	34	19	2	13	71	54	+17	59	
7	SC Eltersdorf	34	15	9	10	65	52	+13	54	
8	SpVgg Bayern Hof	34	14	11	9	46	32	+14	53	
9	TSV Aubstadt	34	16	4	14	46	41	+5	52	
10	SV Erlenbach	34	10	16	8	39	39	0	46	
11	Würzburger FV	34	12	9	13	45	48	−3	45	
12	Alemannia Haibach	34	11	10	13	43	54	−11	43	
13	VfL Frohnlach	34	11	8	15	52	69	−17	41	
14	DJK Ammerthal (R)	34	8	8	18	34	68	−34	32	Qualification to relegation playoffs
15	SpVgg Ansbach (R)	34	9	4	21	46	73	−27	31	Qualification to relegation playoffs
16	FSV Erlangen-Bruck (R)	34	6	7	21	37	72	−35	25	Qualification to relegation playoffs
17	TSV Neudrossenfeld (R)	34	4	9	21	39	73	−34	21	Qualification to relegation playoffs
18	SV Memmelsdorf (R)	34	2	7	25	27	89	−62	13	Relegation to Landesliga Bayern

Source: BFV.de
Rules for classification: 1st points; 2nd head-to-head results; 3rd goal difference; 4th number of goals scored; 5th wins; 6th goals scored away from home; 7th drawing of lots
(C) Champions; (P) Promoted; (R) Relegated

=== Bayernliga Süd ===
The division featured six new clubs with TSV Landsberg, TSV 1865 Dachau, 1. FC Bad Kötzting and DJK Vilzing having been promoted from the Landesliga while TSV Rain am Lech and TSV 1860 Rosenheim had been relegated from the Regionalliga.

Pos	Team	Pld	W	D	L	GF	GA	GD	Pts	Promotion, qualification or relegation
1	TSV Rain am Lech (C, P)	36	26	5	5	100	29	+71	83	Promotion to Regionalliga Bayern
2	SV Pullach (Note: SV Pullach did not apply for a Regionalliga licence, promotion play-off spot went to FC Pipinsried instead.)	36	23	6	7	72	33	+39	75	
3	FC Pipinsried	36	21	9	6	81	43	+38	72	Qualification to promotion playoffs
4	TSV Bogen	36	16	9	11	43	35	+8	57	
5	DJK Vilzing	36	14	11	11	49	55	−6	53	
6	SpVgg Hankofen-Hailing	36	15	7	14	49	51	−2	52 (Note: Han 2–3 Wol; Wol 0–2 Han)	
7	BCF Wolfratshausen	36	15	7	14	60	57	+3	52	
8	TSV Landsberg	36	15	6	15	66	56	+10	51 (Note: Lan 1–1 Unt; Unt 0–3 Lan)	
9	FC Unterföhring	36	14	9	13	68	41	+27	51	
10	TSV 1860 Rosenheim	36	14	6	16	47	60	−13	48 (Note: Ros 1–0 Son; Son 1–2 Ros)	
11	1. FC Sonthofen	36	13	9	14	47	46	+1	48	
12	TSV 1865 Dachau	36	12	9	15	55	62	−7	45 (Note: Dac 1–2 Eic; Eic 3–5 Dac)	
13	VfB Eichstätt	36	10	15	11	47	50	−3	45	
14	TSV Schwabmünchen	36	11	11	14	43	51	−8	44	
15	1. FC Bad Kötzting (R)	36	12	7	17	48	65	−17	43	Qualification to relegation playoffs
16	SpVgg Landshut (R)	36	10	10	16	49	69	−20	40	Qualification to relegation playoffs
17	SV Raisting (R)	36	8	12	16	41	61	−20	36	Qualification to relegation playoffs
18	SB/DJK Rosenheim (R)	36	10	5	21	56	79	−23	35	Relegation to Landesliga Bayern
19	SpVgg Unterhaching II (Note: SpVgg Unterhaching II withdrawn at the end of season.) (R)	36	4	5	27	41	119	−78	17	Relegation to Landesliga Bayern

Source: BFV.de
Rules for classification: 1st points; 2nd head-to-head results; 3rd goal difference; 4th number of goals scored; 5th wins; 6th goals scored away from home; 7th drawing of lots
(C) Champions; (P) Promoted; (R) Relegated

=== Top goalscorers ===
The top goal scorers for the season:

==== Nord ====
Rank	Player	Club	Goals
1	(Germany) Florian Pieper	Viktoria Aschaffenburg	25
2	(Germany) Christian Breunig	Alemannia Haibach	24
3	(Germany) Björn Schnitzer	Viktoria Aschaffenburg	22

==== Süd ====
Rank	Player	Club	Goals
1	(Germany) Sebastian Kinzel	TSV Rain am Lech	51
2	(Germany) Orhan Akkurt	SV Pullach	32
3	(Germany) Efkan Bekiroglu	FC Unterföhring	21

== Promotion play-offs ==
Promotion/relegation play-offs will be held at the end of the season for both the Regionalliga above and the Bayernliga:

=== To the Regionalliga ===
The 15th and 16th placed Regionalliga teams, SV Heimstetten and VfR Garching, play the runners-up of the northern and southern division. In the north this is FC Amberg while, in the south, FC Pipinsried qualified regardless of its place in the table as no other team applied for a Regionalliga licence. The winner of these games then play each other for one more spot in the Regionalliga. Should TSV 1860 Munich have suffered relegation from the 2. Bundesliga its reserve team would be forced to leave the Regionalliga. In this case 17th placed Regionalliga club SV Seligenporten would have entered the relegation play-offs and Heimstetten would retain their Regionalliga place.

==== First round ====
First leg

3 June 2015	FC Pipinsried	2–6	VfR Garching	Altomünster
18:30 CEST	Goia 26'; Eisgruber 53'	Report	Hauck 30'; Ball 36'; Genkinger 39'; M. Niebauer 42'; Vatany 65'; D. Niebauer 88'	Stadium: Stadion an der Reichertshausener Straße; Attendance: 728; Referee: Lothar Ostheimer

3 June 2015	FC Amberg	1–0	SV Heimstetten	Amberg
18:30 CEST	Ceesay 7'	Report		Stadium: Stadion am Schanzl; Attendance: 1,300; Referee: Steffen Mix

Second leg

7 June 2015	VfR Garching	1–0 (7–2 agg.)	FC Pipinsried	Garching
16:00 CEST	Ball 90'	Report		Stadium: Stadion am See; Attendance: 450; Referee: Stefan Treiber

7 June 2015	SV Heimstetten	0–0 (0–1 agg.)	FC Amberg	Kirchheim
16:00 CEST		Report		Stadium: Sportpark Heimstetten; Attendance: 649; Referee: Florian Badstübner

==== Second round ====
The winners of the first round play each other for the one available spot in the Regionalliga:

First leg

10 June 2015	FC Amberg	2–0	VfR Garching	Amberg
18:30 CEST	Werner 33', 56'	Report		Stadium: Stadion am Schanzl; Attendance: 1,668; Referee: Andreas Hartl

Second leg

13 June 2015	VfR Garching	0–1 (0–3 agg.)	FC Amberg	Garching
16:00 CEST		Report	Hempel 84'	Stadium: Stadion am See; Attendance: 1,000; Referee: Günter Perl

=== To the Bayernliga ===
The second placed teams of each of the five Landesliga division, together with the worst 14th placed team and the 15th, 16th and 17th placed teams from the two Bayernligas enter a play-off for the remaining three places in the 2015–16 Bayernliga. The twelve teams will be split into three groups of four clubs.

==== Northern group ====
First round – first leg

27 May 2015
18:30 CEST

1. FC Sand	3–0	FSV Erlangen-Bruck
	Report

27 May 2015
18:30 CEST

SpVgg Selbitz	1–1	TSV Neudrossenfeld
	Report

First round – second leg

30 May 2015
16:00 CEST

FSV Erlangen-Bruck	0–1	1. FC Sand
	Report

Sand won 4–0 on aggregate.

30 May 2015
16:00 CEST

TSV Neudrossenfeld	2–2	SpVgg Selbitz
	Report

Selbitz won 3–3 on aggregate (away goal rule).

Second round – first leg

2 June 2015
18:30 CEST

1. FC Sand	4–0	SpVgg Selbitz
	Report

Second round – second leg

7 June 2015
16:00 CEST

SpVgg Selbitz	1–3	1. FC Sand
	Report

Sand won 7–1 on aggregate.

==== Central group ====
First round – first leg

27 May 2015
18:30 CEST

ASV Burglengenfeld	1–0	DJK Ammerthal
	Report

27 May 2015
18:30 CEST

1. FC Bad Kötzting	2–1	SpVgg Ansbach
	Report

First round – second leg

30 May 2015
16:00 CEST

DJK Ammerthal	1–2	ASV Burglengenfeld
	Report

Burglengenfeld won 3–1 on aggregate.

30 May 2015
16:00 CEST

SpVgg Ansbach	0–1	1. FC Bad Kötzting
	Report

Kötzting won 3–1 on aggregate.

Second round – first leg

2 June 2015
18:30 CEST

ASV Burglengenfeld	2–1	1. FC Bad Kötzting
	Report

Second round – second leg

7 June 2015
16:00 CEST

1. FC Bad Kötzting	1–2	ASV Burglengenfeld
	Report

Burglengenfeld won 4–2 on aggregate.

==== Southern group ====
First round – first leg

27 May 2015
18:30 CEST

FV Illertissen II	2–0	SV Raisting
	Report

27 May 2015
18:30 CEST

SV Erlbach	0–0	SpVgg Landshut
	Report

First round – second leg

30 May 2015
16:00 CEST

SV Raisting	2–1	FV Illertissen II
	Report

Illertissen won 3–2 on aggregate.

30 May 2015
16:00 CEST

SpVgg Landshut	0–2	SV Erlbach
	Report

Erlbach won 2–0 on aggregate.

Second round – first leg

2 June 2015
18:30 CEST

FV Illertissen II	0–2	SV Erlbach
	Report

Second round – second leg

7 June 2015
16:00 CEST

SV Erlbach	1–0	FV Illertissen II
	Report

Erlbach won 3–0 on aggregate.
