= 2012–13 Bayernliga =

Bayernliga
- Season: 2012–13
- Champions: Nord: 1. FC Schweinfurt 05; Süd: SV Schalding-Heining
- Matches: 648 (306 in Bayernliga Nord & 342 in Bayernliga Süd)
- Top goalscorer: Nord: Tom Jäckel (25 goals); Süd: Sebastian Kinzel (25 goals)
- Total attendance: Nord: 117,897; Süd: 77,433
- Average attendance: Nord: 385; Süd: 226

The 2012–13 season of the Bayernliga, the second highest association football league in Bavaria after the creation of the new Regionalliga Bayern, was the fifth season of the league at tier five (V) of the German football league system and the 68th season overall since establishment of the league in 1945. The regular season started on 17 July 2012 and finished on 25 May 2013, followed by relegation play-off games. The league season was interrupted by a winter break, which lasted from 8 December 2012 to 22 February 2013. The league was split into a northern and a southern division, a system last in place in the 1962–63 season, expanding from 18 clubs to 37.

== Standings ==
=== Bayernliga Nord ===
The division featured fourteen new clubs with only TSV Großbardorf, FSV Erlangen-Bruck, Würzburger FV and FC Schweinfurt 05 having played in the Bayernliga in the previous season.

Pos	Team	Pld	W	D	L	GF	GA	GD	Pts	Promotion, qualification or relegation
1	1. FC Schweinfurt 05 (Note: TSV Großbardorf, Würzburger FV, 1. FC Schweinfurt 05, and FC Amberg were the only teams to have applied for a Regionalliga license.) (P)	34	23	8	3	81	31	+50	77	Promotion to Regionalliga Bayern
2	SpVgg Jahn Forchheim	34	22	6	6	79	48	+31	72	Declined promotion (Note: SpVgg Jahn Forchheim declined to apply for a Regionalliga licence.)
3	TSV Großbardorf	34	22	4	8	80	44	+36	70 (Note: Gro 1–2 FCA; FCA 1–3 Gro)	Qualification to promotion playoffs
4	FC Amberg	34	21	7	6	73	34	+39	70	
5	Würzburger FV	34	19	5	10	90	52	+38	62	
6	SpVgg Bayreuth	34	19	5	10	74	53	+21	62	
7	DJK Ammerthal	34	12	11	11	58	49	+9	47	
8	TSV Aubstadt	34	12	10	12	64	61	+3	46	
9	SV Memmelsdorf	34	12	8	14	52	59	−7	44	
10	SV Alemannia Haibach	34	12	6	16	53	52	+1	42	
11	SpVgg Selbitz	34	11	6	17	48	67	−19	39	
12	ASV Neumarkt	34	9	10	15	47	67	−20	37	
13	FSV Erlangen-Bruck	34	11	4	19	57	86	−29	37	
14	ASV Hollfeld	34	10	6	18	43	85	−42	36	
15	1. FC Trogen (R)	34	10	3	21	40	61	−21	33 (Note: Tro 3–0 DJK; DJK 2–0 Tro)	Qualification to relegation playoffs
16	DJK Don Bosco Bamberg (R)	34	8	9	17	39	55	−16	33	Relegation to Landesliga Bayern
17	1. FC Sand (R)	34	8	7	19	42	73	−31	31	Relegation to Landesliga Bayern
18	TSV Kleinrinderfeld (R)	34	5	5	24	42	85	−43	20	Relegation to Landesliga Bayern

Source: fussball
Rules for classification: 1st points; 2nd head-to-head points; 3rd head-to-head goal difference; 4th head-to-head goals scored; 5th head-to-head goals scored away from home (only if two teams are tied in points); 6th goal difference; 7th number of goals scored; 8th wins; 9th goals scored away from home; 10th drawing of lots
(P) Promoted; (R) Relegated

=== Bayernliga Süd ===
The division featured fifteen new clubs with only SB/DJK Rosenheim, TSV Aindling, TSV Gersthofen and SpVgg Unterhaching II having played in the Bayernliga in the previous season.

Pos	Team	Pld	W	D	L	GF	GA	GD	Pts	Promotion, qualification or relegation
1	SV Schalding-Heining (Note: SpVgg Landshut, SV Schalding-Heining, and BC Aichach were the only teams to have applied for a Regionalliga license.) (P)	36	24	6	6	58	26	+32	78	Promotion to Regionalliga Bayern
2	SV Wacker Burghausen II (Note: Reserve teams of Regionalliga clubs are ineligible for Regionalliga promotion.)	36	21	4	11	65	35	+30	67	
3	BC Aichach	36	18	6	12	71	40	+31	60	Qualification to promotion playoffs
4	SpVgg Landshut	36	16	9	11	60	54	+6	57	
5	SSV Jahn Regensburg II	36	15	9	12	56	46	+10	54	
6	SpVgg Unterhaching II	36	16	6	14	55	60	−5	54	
7	FC Unterföhring	36	13	14	9	57	50	+7	53	
8	1. FC Sonthofen	36	14	9	13	53	53	0	51	
9	VfB Eichstätt	36	14	8	14	40	40	0	50	
10	SpVgg Hankofen-Hailing	36	14	7	15	46	54	−8	49	
11	FC Affing	36	14	6	16	62	65	−3	48	
12	SB/DJK Rosenheim	36	13	8	15	50	48	+2	47	
13	BCF Wolfratshausen	36	12	10	14	50	50	0	46	
14	TSV Schwabmünchen	36	12	10	14	37	39	−2	46	
15	TSV Aindling (R)	36	12	5	19	42	63	−21	41	Qualification to relegation playoffs
16	SpVgg GW Deggendorf (R)	36	10	9	17	39	55	−16	39	Qualification to relegation playoffs
17	TSV Gersthofen (R)	36	10	8	18	43	72	−29	38	Relegation to Landesliga Bayern
18	TSV Kottern (R)	36	9	9	18	46	61	−15	36	Relegation to Landesliga Bayern
19	SC Fürstenfeldbruck (R)	36	8	11	17	36	55	−19	35	Relegation to Landesliga Bayern

Source: fussball
Rules for classification: 1st points; 2nd head-to-head points; 3rd head-to-head goal difference; 4th head-to-head goals scored; 5th head-to-head goals scored away from home (only if two teams are tied in points); 6th goal difference; 7th number of goals scored; 8th wins; 9th goals scored away from home; 10th drawing of lots
(P) Promoted; (R) Relegated

=== Top goalscorers ===
The top goal scorers for the season:

==== Nord ====
Rank	Player	Club	Goals
1	(Germany) Tom Jäckel	SpVgg Jahn Forchheim	25
2	(Germany) Pascal Kamolz	Würzburger FV	22
3	(Germany) Steffen Krautschneider	Würzburger FV	17
3	(Germany) Christoph Rützel	TSV Aubstadt	17

==== Süd ====
Rank	Player	Club	Goals
1	(Germany) Sebastian Kinzel	BC Aichach	25
2	(Germany) Simon Knauer	TSV Aindling	21
3	(Germany) Arthur Vogel	FC Affing	20
4	(Germany) Leo Cucic	FC Unterföhring	17

== Promotion play-offs ==
=== To the Regionalliga ===
The third placed teams of each Bayernliga division, TSV Großbardorf and BC Aichach, played the 16th and 17th placed Regionalliga Bayern teams, FC Augsburg II and SpVgg Bayern Hof for two spots in the 2013–14 Regionalliga. Both Augsburg and Hof retained their league place while Aichach and Großbardorf failed to gain promotion:

First leg

29 May 2013

TSV Großbardorf	1–6	SpVgg Bayern Hof
	Report

Westphalen-Stadion, Großbardorf
Attendance: 993
29 May 2013

BC Aichach	1–0	FC Augsburg II
	Report

BCA-Platz an der Schrobenhauser Straße, Aichach
Attendance: 1,100

Second leg

1 June 2013

SpVgg Bayern Hof	2–3	TSV Großbardorf
	Report

Stadion Grüne Au, Hof
Attendance: 683
1 June 2013

FC Augsburg II	5–1	BC Aichach
	Report

Rosenaustadion, Augsburg
Attendance: 1,545

=== To the Bayernliga ===
The second placed teams of each Landesliga division, together with the 15th placed team from the Bayernliga Nord and the 15th and 16th placed team Bayernliga Süd entered a play-off for two more places in the 2013–14 Bayernliga. All three Bayernliga clubs were relegated while the Landesliga teams of SV Raisting and VfR Garching were promoted:

First round – first leg

30 May 2013

VfR Garching	2–2	SpVgg GW Deggendorf

30 May 2013

DJK Vilzing	0–0	TSV Aindling

30 May 2013

SV Friesen	2–0	1. FC Trogen

30 May 2013

SV Raisting	2–1	SV Pettstadt

First round – second leg

2 June 2013

SpVgg GW Deggendorf	0–3	VfR Garching

2 June 2013

TSV Aindling	1–1	DJK Vilzing

4 June 2013

1. FC Trogen	3–3	SV Friesen

4 June 2013

SV Pettstadt	0–0	SV Raisting

Second round – first leg

7 June 2013

SV Friesen	0–1	VfR Garching

7 June 2013

DJK Vilzing	0–0	SV Raisting

Second round – second leg

9 June 2013

VfR Garching	2–0	SV Friesen

9 June 2013

SV Raisting	2–1	DJK Vilzing
