= DJK Ammerthal =

- Full name: Deutsche Jugendkraft Ammerthal e.V.
- Founded: 9 February 1958
- Ground: Sportgelände Pürschläger Weg
- Capacity: 1,500
- Chairman: Stefan Badura
- Manager: Tobias Rösl
- League: Bayernliga Nord (V)
- 2025–26: Landesliga Bayern Nordost, 1st of 18 (promoted)
Home colours	Away colours

The DJK Ammerthal is a German association football club from the town of Ammerthal, Bavaria. DJK stands for Deutsche Jugendkraft, a sports organisation associated with the Catholic Church.

The club's greatest success came in 2012 when it qualified for the new northern division of the expanded Bayernliga, the fifth tier of the German football league system.

== History ==
For most of its history the club has been a non-descript amateur side in local Bavarian football. The club played in the Bezirksliga Oberpfalz-Nord from 1993 onwards, earning promotion to the Bezirksoberliga in 1997 courtesy to a runners-up finish.

DJK made its first appearance in the Bezirksoberliga Oberpfalz, the highest league in Upper Palatinate and the sixth tier of the league system in 1997–98 but lasted for only one season before being relegated back to the Bezirksliga. It returned to the Bezirksoberliga in 2001 as a much stronger side and would play at this level for the next eight season. It finished in the top four on six occasions but missed out on promotion in the promotion round in 2007 and 2008 when it came runners-up in the league. In 2009 however promotion to the Landesliga finally came when it won the league.

The next three seasons the club spent in the Landesliga Bayern-Mitte which would also be the last three seasons the league existed in this format. DJK finished in the upper half of the table in each of those three seasons and a fourth place in 2012 was enough to qualify for the new northern division of the Bayernliga.

In the Bayernliga the club came seventh in its first season and twelfth in its second. After a fourteenth place in 2014–15 the club had to enter the relegation round where it lost to ASV Burglengenfeld and was relegated. Ammerthal bounced back immediately, winning its Landesliga division and earning promotion back to the Bayernliga.

== Honours ==
The club's honours:

- Landesliga Bayern-Mitte
  - Champions: 2016
- Bezirksoberliga Oberpfalz
  - Champions: 2009
  - Runners-up: 2007, 2008
- Bezirksliga Oberpfalz-Nord
  - Champions: 2001
  - Runners-up: 1997

== Recent seasons ==
The recent season-by-season performance of the club:

Season	Division	Tier	Position
1999–2000	Bezirksliga Oberpfalz-Nord	VII	4th
2000–01	Bezirksliga Oberpfalz-Nord	VII	1st ↑
2001–02	Bezirksoberliga Oberpfalz	VI	4th
2002–03	Bezirksoberliga Oberpfalz	VI	8th
2003–04	Bezirksoberliga Oberpfalz	VI	4th
2004–05	Bezirksoberliga Oberpfalz	VI	12th
2005–06	Bezirksoberliga Oberpfalz	VI	4th
2006–07	Bezirksoberliga Oberpfalz	VI	2nd
2007–08	Bezirksoberliga Oberpfalz	VI	2nd
2008–09	Bezirksoberliga Oberpfalz	VII	1st ↑
2009–10	Landesliga Bayern-Mitte	VI	7th
2010–11	Landesliga Bayern-Mitte	VI	7th
2011–12	Landesliga Bayern-Mitte	VI	4th ↑
2012–13	Bayernliga Nord	V	7th
2013–14	Bayernliga Nord	V	12th
2014–15	Bayernliga Nord	V	14th ↓
2015–16	Landesliga Bayern-Mitte	VI	1st ↑
2016–17	Bayernliga Nord	V	12th
2017–18	Bayernliga Nord	V	12th
2018–19	Bayernliga Nord	V	5th
2019–21	Bayernliga Nord	V	8th
2021–22	Bayernliga Nord	V	6th
2022/23	Bayernliga Nord	V	

- With the introduction of the Bezirksoberligas in 1988 as the new fifth tier, below the Landesligas, all leagues below dropped one tier. With the introduction of the Regionalligas in 1994 and the 3. Liga in 2008 as the new third tier, below the 2. Bundesliga, all leagues below dropped one tier. With the establishment of the Regionalliga Bayern as the new fourth tier in Bavaria in 2012 the Bayernliga was split into a northern and a southern division, the number of Landesligas expanded from three to five and the Bezirksoberligas abolished. All leagues from the Bezirksligas onwards were elevated one tier.

=== Key ===
↑ Promoted	↓ Relegated
