= 2015–16 Bayernliga =

Bayernliga
- Season: 2015–16
- Champions: Nord: SV Seligenporten; Süd: VfR Garching
- Promoted: Nord: SV Seligenporten; SpVgg Bayern Hof; Süd: VfR Garching; TSV 1860 Rosenheim
- Relegated: Nord: ASV Burglengenfeld; Eintracht Bamberg; Jahn Forchheim; Süd: SV Erlbach; SpVgg Ruhmannsfelden
- Matches: Nord: 295; Süd: 297
- Top goalscorer: Nord: Christian Breunig (29 goals); Süd: Orhan Akkurt (26 goals)
- Highest attendance: Nord: 2,490; Süd: 1,200
- Lowest attendance: Nord: 40; Süd: 50
- Total attendance: Nord: 99,028; Süd: 86,630
- Average attendance: Nord: 324; Süd: 283
- All statistics correct as of 21 May 2016.

The 2015–16 season of the Bayernliga, the second highest association football league in Bavaria, was the eighth season of the league at tier five (V) of the German football league system and the 71st season overall since establishment of the league in 1945. The league season started on 17 July 2015 and ended on 21 May 2016. It was interrupted by a winter break, which lasted from early December 2015 to late February 2016.

== Modus ==
The northern and southern divisions of the Bayernliga consist of 18 clubs each. Clubs in each division will play each other in a home-and-away format with no league games played between clubs from different divisions during the regular season. The champions of each division are directly promoted to the Regionalliga, subject to fulfilling the licensing regulations of the later with no overall Bayernliga championship game being played between the two league winners. The runners-up of each league take part in promotion round with the 16th and 15th placed clubs in the Regionalliga. The four clubs play for one more spot in the Regionalliga in 2016–17 unless the Regionalliga champion wins promotion to the 3. Liga, in which case two spots in the league may become available. Should the champions or runners-up not receive approval for a Regionalliga licence the direct promotion and play off spots will be passed down to the highest placed club with a licence approval.

The bottom teams in the northern and southern divisions are directly relegated while the 15th, 16th and 17th placed teams from both divisions take part in the relegation playoffs with the five Landesliga runners-up. Originally, the 14th-placed Bayernliga with the lesser points, SV Erlenbach, was also scheduled to enter the relegation round but this was changed on the day of the draw for the round to avoid potentially having two Bayernliga divisions with seventeen clubs each, thereby assuring Erlenbach of a place in the Bayernliga for the following season.

Of the 36 clubs in the league ten applied for a Regionalliga licence for 2016–17 by 11 April 2016, the required date for clubs to hand in their application. The ten clubs consisted of five from the northern division, Großbardorf, Seligenporten, Bayern Hof, Weiden and Aubstadt, and five from the southern division, Garching, Heimstetten, Rosenheim, Sonthofen and Unterföhring. Notable clubs that were in contention for promotion at the time but did not apply were VfB Eichstätt and SV Pullach.

== 2015–16 standings ==
=== Bayernliga Nord ===
The league featured seven new clubs with DJK Don Bosco Bamberg, 1. FC Sand, ASV Burglengenfeld and 1. SC Feucht promoted from the Landesliga while FC Eintracht Bamberg and SV Seligenporten were relegated from the Regionalliga and VfB Eichstätt transferred from the Bayernliga Süd.

Pos	Team	Pld	W	D	L	GF	GA	GD	Pts	Promotion, qualification or relegation
1	SV Seligenporten (C, P)	34	21	6	7	72	42	+30	69	Promotion to Regionalliga Bayern
2	VfB Eichstätt (Note: Club did not apply for a Regionalliga licence, therefore ineligible for promotion.)	34	21	5	8	70	44	+26	68	
3	SpVgg Bayern Hof (P)	34	21	4	9	68	40	+28	67 (Note: Hof ahead of Großbardorf and Weiden on head-to-head points. Großbardorf ahead of Weiden on goal difference after a tied head-to-head.)	Qualification to promotion playoffs
4	TSV Großbardorf	34	19	10	5	57	23	+34	67	
5	SpVgg SV Weiden	34	20	7	7	64	26	+38	67	
6	Alemannia Haibach	34	17	7	10	58	49	+9	58	
7	SC Eltersdorf	34	13	9	12	55	55	0	48	
8	TSV Aubstadt	34	13	8	13	48	49	−1	47	
9	1. FC Sand	34	13	7	14	50	57	−7	46	
10	1. SC Feucht	34	11	7	16	57	61	−4	40	
11	Don Bosco Bamberg	34	11	6	17	55	75	−20	39	
12	Würzburger FV	34	10	8	16	43	55	−12	38 (Note: Würzburg ahead of Regensburg on head-to-head: Würzburg-Regensburg 1–1, Regensburg-Würzburg 0–1.)	
13	Jahn Regensburg II (Note: Reserve teams of Regionalliga clubs are ineligible for Regionalliga promotion.)	34	10	8	16	47	49	−2	38	
14	SV Erlenbach	34	8	11	15	39	51	−12	35	
15	ASV Burglengenfeld (R)	34	8	9	17	32	51	−19	33	Qualification to relegation playoffs
16	Jahn Forchheim (R)	34	8	7	19	38	74	−36	31	Qualification to relegation playoffs
17	VfL Frohnlach (O)	34	7	9	18	41	66	−25	30	Qualification to relegation playoffs
18	Eintracht Bamberg (R)	34	7	8	19	52	79	−27	29	Relegation to Landesliga Bayern

Source: kicker.de, soccerway.com
Rules for classification: 1) Points; 2) goal difference; 3) goals scored; 4) head-to-head results; 5) goals scored away from home against opponent; 6) goals scored away from home; 7) drawing of lots
(C) Champions; (O) Play-off winners; (P) Promoted; (R) Relegated

=== Bayernliga Süd ===
The division featured six new clubs with SV Kirchanschöring, TSV Kottern, SpVgg Ruhmannsfelden and SV Erlbach promoted from the Landesliga while VfR Garching and SV Heimstetten were relegated from the Regionalliga.

Pos	Team	Pld	W	D	L	GF	GA	GD	Pts	Promotion, qualification or relegation
1	VfR Garching (C, P)	34	21	5	8	67	29	+38	68	Promotion to Regionalliga Bayern
2	SV Pullach (Note: Club did not apply for a Regionalliga licence, therefore ineligible for promotion.)	34	18	11	5	63	37	+26	65	
3	TSV 1860 Rosenheim (P)	34	19	7	8	66	39	+27	64	Qualification to promotion playoffs
4	1. FC Sonthofen	34	17	9	8	62	33	+29	60	
5	FC Unterföhring	34	17	8	9	55	43	+12	59	
6	SV Heimstetten	34	17	7	10	63	47	+16	58	
7	SV Kirchanschöring	34	14	9	11	48	45	+3	51	
8	TSV 1865 Dachau	34	12	9	13	55	48	+7	45	
9	SpVgg Hankofen-Hailing	34	13	5	16	48	55	−7	44	
10	FC Pipinsried	34	11	10	13	50	56	−6	43	
11	TSV Kottern	34	11	9	14	59	58	+1	42	
12	DJK Vilzing	34	11	9	14	40	47	−7	42	
13	BCF Wolfratshausen	34	11	9	14	47	64	−17	42	
14	TSV Schwabmünchen	34	12	6	16	43	64	−21	42	
15	TSV Landsberg (O)	34	10	11	13	51	54	−3	41	Qualification to relegation playoffs
16	TSV Bogen (O)	34	8	12	14	55	66	−11	36	Qualification to relegation playoffs
17	SV Erlbach (R)	34	8	9	17	36	53	−17	33	Qualification to relegation playoffs
18	SpVgg Ruhmannsfelden (R)	34	1	5	28	22	92	−70	8	Relegation to Landesliga Bayern

Source: kicker.de, soccerway.com
Rules for classification: 1) Points; 2) Goal difference; 3) Goals scored; 4) head-to-head results; 5) goals scored away from home against opponent; 6) goals scored away from home; 7) drawing of lots
(C) Champions; (O) Play-off winners; (P) Promoted; (R) Relegated

=== Top goalscorers ===
The top goal scorers for the season:

==== Nord ====
Rank	Player	Club	Goals
1	(Germany) Christian Breunig	Alemannia Haibach	29
2	(Czech Republic) Martin Holek	SpVgg Bayern Hof	28
3	(Germany) Bastian Herzner	SC Eltersdorf	25
4	(Germany) Sebastian Schulik	1. SC Feucht	23

==== Süd ====
Rank	Player	Club	Goals
1	(Germany) Orhan Akkurt	SV Heimstetten	26
2	(Germany) Dennis Niebauer	VfR Garching	24
3	(Bosnia and Herzegovina) Josip Tomic	TSV 1860 Rosenheim	19
4	(Germany) Andreas Faber	FC Unterföhring	18

== Promotion play-off ==
A promotion/relegation play-off will be held at the end of the season for both the Regionalliga above and the Bayernliga.

=== To the Regionalliga ===
The 15th and 16th placed Regionalliga teams, Viktoria Aschaffenburg and FC Augsburg II, played the third-placed teams of the northern and southern divisions. The winners of these games are qualified for the 2016–17 Regionalliga, the losers played each other for one more spot in the Regionalliga after Jahn Regensburg was successful in winning promotion to the 3. Liga. The third placed teams that qualified were SpVgg Bayern Hof in the north and TSV 1860 Rosenheim in the south as the runners-up of the two Bayernliga divisions did not apply for a Regionalliga licence.

Round one

Team 1	Agg.	Team 2	1st leg	2nd leg
SpVgg Bayern Hof	4–2	Viktoria Aschaffenburg	2–1	2–1
TSV 1860 Rosenheim	2–2 (a)	FC Augsburg II	2–1	0–1

Round two

Team 1	Agg.	Team 2	1st leg	2nd leg
TSV 1860 Rosenheim	1–0	Viktoria Aschaffenburg	0–0	1–0

=== To the Bayernliga ===
The second placed teams of each of the five Landesliga divisions, together with the 15th, 16th and 17th placed teams from the two Bayernligas enter a play-off for the remaining three places in the 2016–17 Bayernliga. The eleven teams will be split into three groups with group winner earning a Bayernliga place for the next season. With the promotions of Jahn Regensburg and TSV 1860 Rosenheim to 3. Liga and Regionalliga Bayern respectively, an interdivisional play-off determined the last participant for next season. Group losers ASV Burglengenfeld, SV Erlbach and VfL Frohnlach were supposed to play in a single round-robin, but Burglengenfeld declined and was relegated, leaving Erlbach and Frohnlach to play for the remaining slot.

==== Regional group north ====
Round one

Team 1	Agg.	Team 2	1st leg	2nd leg
Würzburger Kickers II	5–3	Jahn Forchheim	1–1	4–2

- VfL Frohnlach received a bye after SV Erlenbach's participation was cancelled

Round two

Team 1	Agg.	Team 2	1st leg	2nd leg
Würzburger Kickers II	7–0	VfL Frohnlach	4–0	3–0

==== Regional group central ====
Round one

Team 1	Agg.	Team 2	1st leg	2nd leg
TSV Kornburg	2–5	ASV Burglengenfeld	0–2	2–3
Fortuna Regensburg	2–3	TSV Bogen	0–1	2–2

Round two

Team 1	Agg.	Team 2	1st leg	2nd leg
ASV Burglengenfeld	2–6	TSV Bogen	1–3	1–3

==== Regional group south ====
Round one

Team 1	Agg.	Team 2	1st leg	2nd leg
FC Deisenhofen	1–2	SV Erlbach	0–2	1–0
SV Mering	1–4	TSV Landsberg	1–3	0–1

Round two

Team 1	Agg.	Team 2	1st leg	2nd leg
SV Erlbach	0–3	TSV Landsberg	0–1	0–2

==== Interregional play-off ====
Team 1	Agg.	Team 2	1st leg	2nd leg
VfL Frohnlach	1–0	SV Erlbach	0–0	1–0
