= TSV Bogen =

German football club

- Full name: Turn- und Sportverein 1883 Bogen e.V.
- Founded: 23 April 1883
- Ground: Stadion Kotaustraße
- Capacity: 4,000
- League: Landesliga Bayern-Mitte (VI)
- 2018–19: 10th
Home colours	Away colours

The TSV Bogen is a German association football club from the town of Bogen, Bavaria.

The club's greatest success came in 2013 when it qualified for the southern division of the Bayernliga, the fifth tier of the German football league system.

== History ==
TSV Bogen was formed in 1883 and, for most of its history, has been a non-descript amateur side in local Bavarian football. Formed as a gymnastics club TSV started operating a football department in 1926. For a short time, after the Second World War, the club was renamed ASV Bogen but soon reverted to its original name. The club briefly rose to the tier four 2. Amateurliga for a season in 1953–54 but was promptly relegated again. After this the club continued, for a time, to be a force in the local A-Klasse but was eventually relegated to the B-Klasse in 1961. Only in 1970 did the club return to the A-Klasse, followed by promotion to the Bezirksliga in 1972.

TSV played in one of the two divisions of the Bezirksliga Niederbayern from 1972 to 1985, on occasion coming close to Landesliga promotion without quite succeeding. After 1985 a lengthy decline followed, lasting until 2008 when the club once more won promotion to the Bezirksliga, where it played for two seasons from 2008 to 2010. It finished runners-up on both occasions, earning promotion to the Bezirksoberliga in 2010.

In its first Bezirksoberliga Niederbayern season the club finished sixth, followed by a third place in 2012. With the league disbanded at the end of that season and the Landesligas expanded from three to five divisions Bogen qualified for the new Landesliga Bayern-Mitte. In this league the club came first in the inaugural 2012–13 season and won promotion to the Bayernliga.

In its first season in the southern division of the Bayernliga the club finished in sixth place, followed by a fourth place the year after. Bogen was relegated two seasons later.

== Honours ==
The club's honours:

- Landesliga Bayern-Mitte
  - Champions: 2013
- Bezirksliga Niederbayern-West
  - Runners-up: 2009, 2010
- Kreisliga Straubing
  - Champions: 2008

== Recent seasons ==
The recent season-by-season performance of the club:

Season	Division	Tier	Position
1999–2000			
2000–01			
2001–02			
2002–03			
2003–04			
2004–05	Kreisklasse Straubing 1	IX	3rd
2005–06	Kreisklasse Straubing 1	IX	1st ↑
2006–07	Kreisliga Straubing 2	VIII	2nd
2007–08	Kreisliga Straubing 2	VIII	1st ↑
2008–09	Bezirksliga Niederbayern-West	VIII	2nd
2009–10	Bezirksliga Niederbayern-West	VIII	2nd ↑
2010–11	Bezirksoberliga Niederbayern	VII	6th
2011–12	Bezirksoberliga Niederbayern	VII	3rd ↑
2012–13	Landesliga Bayern-Mitte	VI	1st ↑
2013–14	Bayernliga Süd	V	6th
2014–15	Bayernliga Süd	V	4th
2015–16	Bayernliga Süd	V	16th
2016–17	Bayernliga Süd	V	17th ↓
2017–18	Landesliga Bayern-Mitte	VI	8th
2018–19	Landesliga Bayern-Mitte	VI	10th

- With the introduction of the Bezirksoberligas in 1988 as the new fifth tier, below the Landesligas, all leagues below dropped one tier. With the introduction of the Regionalligas in 1994 and the 3. Liga in 2008 as the new third tier, below the 2. Bundesliga, all leagues below dropped one tier. With the establishment of the Regionalliga Bayern as the new fourth tier in Bavaria in 2012 the Bayernliga was split into a northern and a southern division, the number of Landesligas expanded from three to five and the Bezirksoberligas abolished. All leagues from the Bezirksligas onwards were elevated one tier.

=== Key ===
↑ Promoted	↓ Relegated
