= SpVgg Hankofen-Hailing =

- Full name: Spielvereinigung Hankofen-Hailing 1968 e.V.
- Founded: 1968
- Ground: Maierhofer Bau-Stadion
- Capacity: 2,000
- Chairman: Alois Beck
- Manager: Heribert Ketterl
- League: Bayernliga Süd (V)
- 2025–26: Regionalliga Bayern, 17th of 18 (relegated)
Home colours	Away colours

SpVgg Hankofen-Hailing is a German association football club from the villages of Hankofen and Hailing in the municipality of Leiblfing, Bavaria.

The club's greatest success came in 2022 when it qualified for Regionalliga Bayern, in the fourth tier of the German football league system.

== History ==
For most of its history, the club has been an undistinguished amateur side in local Bavarian football. The club's rise began in 1992 when it was promoted to the Kreisklasse Dingolfing where it finished runners-up in 1993 and 1994 before winning promotion to the Bezirksliga in 1995.

Thirty years after its formation, the club rose to the highest league in Lower Bavaria, the Bezirksoberliga Niederbayern, for the first time in 1998 on the strength of a Bezirksliga Niederbayern-West title and played at that level for the next three seasons. SpVgg immediately became a strong side at this level, finishing sixth in its first season and fourth in its second and won the league in its third. The latter allowed the club to move up to the Landesliga Bayern-Mitte, where it would play for the next five seasons. After a difficult first year, the club finished in the upper half of the table for the second, third and fourth seasons there, but was relegated in 2006 after finishing 15th.

SpVgg bounced back immediately, winning the Bezirksoberliga again and returning to the Landesliga. It was unable to establish itself however, finished 16th, and was relegated again. Two more seasons in the Bezirksoberliga followed before the club won a third league title there and moved up to the Landesliga again. This third title also equaled SpVgg GW Deggendorf's record of three titles in the Bezirksoberliga Niederbayern, which no other club achieved until the league was disbanded in 2012.

Back in the Landesliga, SpVgg performed much better as in the past, coming fourth in its first year there. The second season, the last of the league in its current format, saw a sixth-place finish and allowed the club to move up to the southern division of the newly expanded Bayernliga.

In its first Bayernliga season, the club came tenth, followed by a seventh place in 2013–14 and a sixth place the year after.

The club won promotion to the Regionalliga Bayern in the 2021–22, finishing first in the Bayernliga Süd.

== Current squad ==
As of 5 February 2026

Note: Flags indicate national team as defined under FIFA eligibility rules; some limited exceptions apply. Players may hold more than one non-FIFA nationality.

No.	Pos.	Nation	Player
1	GK	GER	Patrik Neumayer
2	DF	GER	Daniel Ertel
4	DF	GER	David Schneider
5	MF	GER	Simon Pichlmeier
6	DF	GER	Korbinian Stütz
7	FW	GER	Florian Sommersberger
8	MF	GER	Samuel Pex
9	FW	KOS	Fanol Lutolli
10	MF	GER	Baran Berk
11	DF	GER	Daniel Rabanter
12	DF	GER	Brian Wagner
13	DF	GER	David Löffler
14	DF	GER	Patrick Choroba

No.	Pos.	Nation	Player
17	MF	GER	Sven Hodo
18	MF	AUT	Ante Banden
19	FW	GER	Lukas Käufl
20	FW	GER	Daniel Zormeier
21	GK	GER	Sebastian Maier
22	FW	GER	Tobias Lermer
23	MF	GER	Tobias Gayring
24	DF	GER	Alexander Nittnaus
27	DF	GER	Lennard Stockinger
35	GK	POL	Adrian Serowiec
79	FW	GER	Cem Cevizci
87	FW	GER	Andreas Wagner

== Honours ==
The club's honours:

=== League ===
- Bayernliga Süd (V)
  - Champions: 2022
- Bezirksoberliga Niederbayern
  - Champions: 2001 (VI), 2007 (VI), 2010 (VII)
- Bezirksliga Niederbayern-West (VII)
  - Champions: 1998

==== Cup ====
- Niederbayern Cup
  - Runners-up: 2001, 2004, 2005

== Recent seasons ==
The recent season-by-season performance of the club:

Season	Division	Tier	Position
1999–2000	Bezirksoberliga Niederbayern	VI	4th
2000–01	Bezirksoberliga Niederbayern	VI	1st ↑
2001–02	Landesliga Bayern-Mitte	V	13th
2002–03	Landesliga Bayern-Mitte	V	7th
2003–04	Landesliga Bayern-Mitte	V	9th
2004–05	Landesliga Bayern-Mitte	V	9th
2005–06	Landesliga Bayern-Mitte	V	15th ↓
2006–07	Bezirksoberliga Niederbayern	VI	1st ↑
2007–08	Landesliga Bayern-Mitte	V	16th ↓
2008–09	Bezirksoberliga Niederbayern	VII	11th
2009–10	Bezirksoberliga Niederbayern	VII	1st ↑
2010–11	Landesliga Bayern-Mitte	VI	4th
2011–12	Landesliga Bayern-Mitte	VI	6th ↑
2012–13	Bayernliga Süd	V	10th
2013–14	Bayernliga Süd	V	7th
2014–15	Bayernliga Süd	V	6th
2015–16	Bayernliga Süd	V	9th
2016–17	Bayernliga Süd	V	13th
2017–18	Bayernliga Süd	V	13th
2018–19	Bayernliga Süd	V	13th
2019–21	Bayernliga Süd	V	14th
2021–22	Bayernliga Süd	V	1st ↑
2022–23	Regionalliga Bayern	IV	18th ↓
2023–24	Bayernliga Süd	V	1st ↑
2024–25	Regionalliga Bayern	IV	16th
2025–26	Regionalliga Bayern	IV	18th ↓

- With the introduction of the Bezirksoberligas in 1988 as the new fifth tier, below the Landesligas, all leagues below dropped one tier. With the introduction of the Regionalligas in 1994 and the 3. Liga in 2008 as the new third tier, below the 2. Bundesliga, all leagues below dropped one tier. With the establishment of the Regionalliga Bayern as the new fourth tier in Bavaria in 2012 the Bayernliga was split into a northern and a southern division, the number of Landesligas expanded from three to five and the Bezirksoberligas abolished. All leagues from the Bezirksligas onwards were elevated one tier.

=== Key ===
↑ Promoted	↓ Relegated
