= 1. FC Bad Kötzting =

German association football club

- Full name: 1. FC Bad Kötzting 1921 e.V.
- Founded: 5 May 1921
- Ground: Stadion am Roten Steg
- Capacity: 6,000
- Chairman: Hans Kuchler
- Manager: Peter Gallmaier
- League: Landesliga Bayern-Mitte (VI)
- 2016–17: 5th
Home colours	Away colours

1. FC Bad Kötzting is a German association football club from the city of Bad Kötzting, Bavaria.

== History ==
Founded on 5 May 1921 as 1. FC Kötzting, the club spent most of its existence as a lower-tier side until earning promotion to the Landesliga Bayern-Mitte (V) in 1990. The club had a good second season in this league, finishing third in 1993, but it came close to relegation in 1998, when it could only come 15th.

The team came close to advancing to the Bayernliga (IV) in 2000, finishing as league vice-champions before losing on penalties to SpVgg Landshut in the promotion round. They earned promotion in 2004. The club adopted its new name in 2006 after the city changed its name in 2005. 1. FC Bad Kötzting was relegated in 2010 and the team, after this, played in the Landesliga Bayern-Mitte again. At the end of the 2011–12 season the club qualified for the promotion round to the newly expanded Bayernliga. A first round loss to FC Amberg however meant the club would remain in the Landesliga instead. The club won the Landesliga Mitte in 2014 and earned promotion back to the Bayernliga. The club won promotion to the Bayernliga in 2014, after a Landesliga championship, but came only fifteenth in the league in 2014–15 and was forced to enter the promotion/relegation round where it suffered relegation after being defeated by ASV Burglengenfeld.

Bad Kötzting plays its home matches in the Stadion am Roten Steg which has a capacity of 6,000 (800 seats).

== Honors ==
=== League ===
- Landesliga Bayern-Mitte (V)
  - Champions: 2004
  - Runners-up: 2000
- Landesliga Bayern-Mitte (VI)
  - Champions: 2014
- Bezirksoberliga Niederbayern (V)
  - Champions: 1990

=== Cup ===
- Niederbayern Cup
  - Winners: 2005

== Recent seasons ==
The recent season-by-season performance of the club:

Year	Division	Tier	Position
1999–2000	Landesliga Bayern-Mitte	V	2nd
2000–01	Landesliga Bayern-Mitte	V	9th
2001–02	Landesliga Bayern-Mitte	V	8th
2002–03	Landesliga Bayern-Mitte	V	5th
2003–04	Landesliga Bayern-Mitte	V	1st ↑
2004–05	Bayernliga	IV	6th
2005–06	Bayernliga	IV	5th
2006–07	Bayernliga	IV	11th
2007–08	Bayernliga	IV	11th
2008–09	Bayernliga	V	13th
2009–10	Bayernliga	V	19th ↓
2010–11	Landesliga Bayern-Mitte	VI	11th
2011–12	Landesliga Bayern-Mitte	VI	9th
2012–13	Landesliga Bayern-Mitte	VI	8th
2013–14	Landesliga Bayern-Mitte	VI	1st ↑
2014–15	Bayernliga Süd	V	15th ↓
2015–16	Landesliga Bayern-Mitte	VI	3rd
2016–17	Landesliga Bayern-Mitte	VI	5th
2017–18	Landesliga Bayern-Mitte		

- With the introduction of the Bezirksoberligas in 1988 as the new fifth tier, below the Landesligas, all leagues below dropped one tier. With the introduction of the Regionalligas in 1994 and the 3. Liga in 2008 as the new third tier, below the 2. Bundesliga, all leagues below dropped one tier. With the establishment of the Regionalliga Bayern as the new fourth tier in Bavaria in 2012 the Bayernliga was split into a northern and a southern division, the number of Landesligas expanded from three to five and the Bezirksoberligas abolished. All leagues from the Bezirksligas onwards were elevated one tier.

↑ Promoted	↓ Relegated
