= ASV Cham =

German football club

- Full name: Allgemeiner Sportverein Cham 1863 e. V.
- Founded: 1863
- Ground: Stadion an der Further Straße
- Capacity: 3,000
- Chairman: Christine Gabriel
- Manager: Faruk Maloku
- League: Bayernliga Nord (V)
- 2025–26: Bayernliga Nord, 2nd of 17
Home colours	Away colours

ASV Cham is a German association football club from the city of Cham, Bavaria. The club's most notable achievement was playing in the second division from 1950 to 1962.

== History ==
The ASV Cham was formed as a gymnastics club in 1863, under the name of TV Cham, which joined the local Freiwillige Feuerwehr in 1869 and was not refounded until 1880. TV established a football department in 1919 and, in 1925, SC Olympia Cham merged with the club. The footballers went independent as FC Chambia Cham in 1927, but rejoined the club in 1930.

After the Second World War, TV was joined by another club, FC Cham, adopting the current name, ASV Cham. The new club almost immediately enjoyed some success, earning promotion to the Landesliga Bayern (II) in 1949 by winning its local Oberpfalz league and then coming first in the promotion round.

The 1949–50 season of the Landesliga was to be the last for the league as a new second division for the region, the 2nd Oberliga Süd, was to be formed. To qualify for this league, Cham had to finish in the top-five of the division, which it did, despite an equal win–loss record. After only one season in the Landesliga, the club had earned promotion to the 2nd Oberliga alongside 1. FC Bamberg, FC Bayern Hof, TSV Straubing and FC Wacker München.

ASV was to become the second-longest serving club in this league, behind 1. FC Pforzheim, who played every season of it, and equal to SV Wiesbaden, who, like Cham played all but one.

In the first season of the new 2nd Oberliga, 1950–51, ASV achieved a very respectable fifth place, four points behind a promotion rank. The following season, the team only managed a 13th place but stayed well clear of the relegation ranks in points. The 1952–53 season saw a repeat of this result but this time, relegation was only avoided by four points. The 1953–54 and 1954–55 seasons saw the club continue to struggle but in 1955–56, it returned to better results, coming fifth once more. The following season saw a repeat of this result. In 1957–58, it finished ninth.

From 1958 onwards, the club's fortunes declined and four seasons of struggle against relegation followed. ASV came ever closer to dropping down to the Amateurliga Bayern, in 1960–61 avoiding it by only one point. The club's last season in the 2nd Oberliga, 1961–62, was a disaster, finishing last, 14 points clear of a non-relegation spot, and ASV dropped down to the third division alongside SpVgg Bayreuth and SV Wiesbaden.

The introduction of the Fußball-Bundesliga in 1963 meant large-scale changes to the German football league system. The Oberligas and 2nd Oberligas were disbanded and in Bavaria, the Amateurliga Bayern was reduced from two to one division. Back in the southern division of Bavaria's highest football league, the Amateurliga Südbayern, Cham achieved a fifth place, enough to qualify for the new single-division league. This, however, proved to be a short-lived success; in 1963–64, the club came last and found itself relegated to the Landesliga Bayern-Mitte (IV), not returning to Bavaria's highest league again for more than half a century.

In the Landesliga, the club established itself as a mid-table side for the first couple of seasons but in 1968, it suffered another relegation, now to the Bezirksliga Oberpfalz (V). ASV Cham disappeared in the lower amateur leagues of the Oberpfalz region, even briefly dropping out of the Bezirksliga in 1974, but in 1978 it earned promotion back to the Landesliga. Its first season back was an unsuccessful one, being relegated back down, eleven points clear of a non-relegation spot. ASV made a number of unsuccessful attempt at Landesliga survival in 1982–83, 1984 to 86 and 1987–88 before finally settling back permanently in this league from 1991.

ASV Cham became a permanent fixture of the Landesliga, playing for 17 consecutive seasons in it from 1991 to 2008. In 2001, it became one of the many waypoints for continent-hopping goalkeeper Lutz Pfannenstiel, after a stint with Bradford Park Avenue and before signing with Dunedin Technical again. The club's best result in this era was a third place in 2001–02, when it came within three points of second-placed SpVgg Landshut and the right to take part in the Bayernliga promotion round. In 2007, the club briefly signed former Ghanaian international Emmanuel Osei. In 2007–08, the club experienced another disastrous season and finished last in the league, having to drop down to the Bezirksoberliga Oberpfalz for the 2008–09 season with only four wins out of 34 games.

After three seasons in the Bezirksoberliga ASV won the league and return to the Landesliga. At the end of the 2011–12 season the club qualified for the promotion round to the newly expanded Bayernliga. A first-round loss to Dergah Spor Nürnberg however meant the club would remain in the Landesliga instead. In 2018–19 ASV ended the season in second place and thus entered the promotion round to the Bayernliga again. Against ASV Vach, Cham succeeded with wins in both legs, returning to the Bayernliga after a 55-season absence.

== Honours ==
The club's honours:

=== League ===
- Oberpfalz championship (III)
  - Winners: 1949
- Bezirksoberliga Oberpfalz (V)
  - Champions: (2) 1991, 2011
  - Runners-up: (2) 1989, 2010

== Recent seasons ==
The recent season-by-season performance of the club:

Year	Division	Tier	Position
1999–2000	Landesliga Bayern-Mitte	V	14th
2000–01	Landesliga Bayern-Mitte	V	13th
2001–02	Landesliga Bayern-Mitte	V	3rd
2002–03	Landesliga Bayern-Mitte	V	9th
2003–04	Landesliga Bayern-Mitte	V	6th
2004–05	Landesliga Bayern-Mitte	V	12th
2005–06	Landesliga Bayern-Mitte	V	12th
2006–07	Landesliga Bayern-Mitte	V	8th
2007–08	Landesliga Bayern-Mitte	V	18th ↓
2008–09	Bezirksoberliga Oberpfalz	VII	6th
2009–10	Bezirksoberliga Oberpfalz	VII	2nd
2010–11	Bezirksoberliga Oberpfalz	VII	1st ↑
2011–12	Landesliga Bayern-Mitte	VI	13th
2012–13	Landesliga Bayern-Mitte	VI	3rd
2013–14	Landesliga Bayern-Mitte	VI	8th
2014–15	Landesliga Bayern-Mitte	VI	4th
2015–16	Landesliga Bayern-Mitte	VI	5th
2016–17	Landesliga Bayern-Mitte	VI	3rd
2017–18	Landesliga Bayern-Mitte	VI	4th
2018–19	Landesliga Bayern-Mitte	VI	2nd ↑
2019–21	Bayernliga Nord	V	11th
2021–22	Bayernliga Nord	V	13th
2022–23	Bayernliga Nord		

- With the introduction of the Bezirksoberligas in 1988 as the new fifth tier, below the Landesligas, all leagues below dropped one tier. With the introduction of the Regionalligas in 1994 and the 3. Liga in 2008 as the new third tier, below the 2. Bundesliga, all leagues below dropped one tier. With the establishment of the Regionalliga Bayern as the new fourth tier in Bavaria in 2012 the Bayernliga was split into a northern and a southern division, the number of Landesligas expanded from three to five and the Bezirksoberligas abolished. All leagues from the Bezirksligas onwards were elevated one tier.
- The 2020–21 Bavarian football season was cancelled due to the COVID-19 pandemic in Germany, and the original 2019–20 season was extended until the spring of 2021.

↑ Promoted	↓ Relegated
