= Paul Grauschopf =

German footballer (born 1998)

Personal information
- Date of birth: 15 August 1998 (age 28)
- Place of birth: Mallersdorf-Pfaffenberg, Germany
- Height: 1.83 m (6 ft 0 in)
- Position: Defensive midfielder

Team information
- Current team: DJK Vilzing
- Number: 5

Youth career
- 2003–2009: TSV Ergoldsbach
- 2009–2013: Jahn Regensburg
- 2013–2016: Greuther Fürth
- 2016–2017: RB Leipzig

Senior career*
Years	Team	Apps	(Gls)
2017	RB Leipzig II	1	(0)
2017–2019	FC Ingolstadt II	49	(1)
2019–2021	SpVgg Unterhaching	48	(5)
2021–2023	SV Donaustauf	57	(11)
2023–	DJK Vilzing	91	(19)

International career^{‡}
2013–2014	Germany U16	8	(1)
2014–2015	Germany U17	6	(1)
2016	Germany U19	1	(0)
- * Club domestic league appearances and goals as of 27 September 2026 ‡ National team caps and goals as of 12:10, 5 August 2019 (UTC)

Paul Grauschopf (born 15 August 1998) is a German footballer who plays as a defensive midfielder for Regionalliga Bayern club DJK Vilzing.

== Career ==
Grauschopf made his debut for SpVgg Unterhaching on 3 August 2019, starting in the home match against Hansa Rostock which finished as a 1–0 win.

On 11 July 2021, Grauschopf signed a two-year contract with Bayernliga club SV Donaustauf.
