= TSV Straubing =

German football club

- Full name: Turn- und Sportverein 1861 Straubing e.V.
- Founded: 1861
- League: Defunct
- 2012–13: Kreisklasse Straubing 1 (IX), 14th ↓
Home colours	Away colours

The TSV Straubing was a German association football club from the city of Straubing, Bavaria. The club achieved notability by playing in the second division from 1950 to 1961.

TSV Straubing was also the parent club of what is now the Straubing Tigers in the Deutsche Eishockey Liga, which split from the TSV in 1981.

== History ==
=== Early years ===
The club was formed as a gymnastics club in 1861, under the name of TV Jahn Straubing. Football in Straubing was first represented at top-level in the 1931–32 season, when the FC Straubing, formed in 1921, spent a year in the Bezirksliga Bayern. Another attempt was made by the military team of Luftwaffen SV Straubing, which played in the Gauliga Südbayern from 1942 to 1944.

=== 1945 to 1963 ===
The resulting club, TSV Straubing, formed in 1945 out of a merger of TV Jahn and FC, first appeared in the upper reaches of Bavarian football in 1946, when a regional Lower Bavaria title earned it promotion to the Landesliga Bayern (II). TSV became part of the southern division of this league, where it played for two seasons as a mid-table side. In 1948, when the league was again reduced to one single division, Straubing missed out on direct qualification, coming seventh when a sixth place was needed. The club was however offered a second chance, having to play the seventh placed team from the north and beating TSV 04 Schwabach 1–0 and thereby securing a spot for the next Landesliga season after all.

TSV earned another seventh place in 1948–49 but improved the season after, coming third. This proved enough to qualify for the 2nd Oberliga Süd, the new second division for Southern Germany, and, alongside 1. FC Bamberg, FC Bayern Hof, FC Wacker München and ASV Cham, the club left the Bavarian football leagues for the first time in its history.

Straubing scored another seventh place in 1950–51, its first season in the 2nd Oberliga and performed one spot better in the following year. In 1952–53, it came closer to relegation trouble, finishing eleventh; the next year a 13th place and a gap of only four points saw the club's worst season in the league yet. In 1955, the team finished sixth, after that, until 1957, it became a secure mid-table side. The 1957–58 season saw TSV came within two points of relegation, despite finishing twelfth out of eighteen teams. After this, two got seasons followed with mid-table results again.

The 1960–61 season was to be Straubings last as a second division side, it came last in the league and was narrowly relegated, one point shy of a non-relegation spot.

Back in the third division, which was now the Amateurliga Südbayern, TSV finished fourth in 1962 and took out the league title the season after. The club was unfortunate in that the introduction of the Fußball-Bundesliga and the disbanding of the Oberliga and 2nd Oberliga meant, no promotion was available that season. TSV, having won all 16 home games this season, also took out the Bavarian championship with a 5–1 win in the third game against 1. FC Bamberg from the northern division.

=== 1963 to 1984 ===
As a further change to the league system, Bavaria's top league now played in single division format again and TSV Straubing very narrowly avoided relegation in 1963–64. The club improved again after this, earning upper-table finishes in the coming seasons, going as far as a third place in 1967–68. After this, the club rapidly declined, finishing 16th in 1969 but staying up. Another 16th place the year after however meant relegation to the Landesliga Bayern-Mitte (IV).

Straubing came second in the Landesliga in 1970–71 but only the champions were promoted in this era and the club's fortunes in the league became a mixed bag after this, a good season followed by an average one. In 1976–77, another second place, two points behind champions FC Herzogenaurach, proved again not enough and in 1979 the club suffered relegation to the Bezirksliga instead. Straubing immediately recovered, earned promotion back to the Landesliga and finished second once more in the league in 1981 and unsuccessfully took part in the Promotion to the Oberliga Bayern. That season, the clubs ice hockey department left to form the EHC Straubing. The club finally returned to what was now the Amateur Oberliga Bayern in 1982, taking out the league title in the Landesliga. TSV finished seventh in this league in 1982–83, on equal points with newly relegated TSV 1860 Munich, but could only finish 18th the year after and was relegated back to the Landesliga.

=== 1984 to present ===
Back in the Landesliga, Straubing was immediately relegated again, to the Bezirksliga. It managed to recover but came last in the Landesliga in 1986–87 and did not manage to return to this level for another nine seasons. The club became part of the new Bezirksoberliga Niederbayern in 1988.

In 1996, the club took out the Bezirksoberliga Niederbayern (VI) title and returned to the Landesliga for five seasons. Initially, starting with a fifth place, the club performed well but then declined season by season and was once again relegated in 2001, after an 18th-place finish.

In 2009 Straubing was relegated from the Bezirksliga and the club dropped through the ranks from there, to the Kreisklasse in 2011 and the A-Klasse in 2013. The club became insolvent in April 2013 and was automatically relegated from the Kreisklasse to the A-Klasse. The club however did not field a team in 2013–14. At some stage after this the club was disbanded.

With a professional tier-one ice hockey team in Straubing, the Straubing Tigers, playing in the Deutsche Eishockey Liga, the club faced stiff competition for media attention and sponsorship.

== Honours ==
The club's honours:

=== League ===
- Amateurliga Südbayern (III)
  - Champions: 1963
- Niederbayern championship (III)
  - Champions: 1946
- Landesliga Bayern-Mitte (IV)
  - Champions: 1982
  - Runners-up: (3) 1971, 1977, 1981
- Bezirksoberliga Niederbayern (VI)
  - Champions: 1996
  - Runners-up: 1989
- Bezirksliga Niederbayern-West (VII)
  - Champions: 2005

=== Youth ===
- Bavarian under 19 championship
  - Runners-up: (2) 1954, 1974

== Final seasons ==
The final season-by-season performance of the club:

Season	Division	Tier	Position
1999–2000	Landesliga Bayern-Mitte	V	13th
2000–01	Landesliga Bayern-Mitte	V	18th ↓
2001–02	Bezirksoberliga Niederbayern	VI	15th ↓
2002–03	Bezirksliga Niederbayern-West	VII	8th
2003–04	Bezirksliga Niederbayern-West	VII	3rd
2004–05	Bezirksliga Niederbayern-West	VII	1st ↑
2005–06	Bezirksoberliga Niederbayern	VI	8th
2006–07	Bezirksoberliga Niederbayern	VI	14th ↓
2007–08	Bezirksliga Niederbayern-West	VII	12th
2008–09	Bezirksliga Niederbayern-West	VIII	12th ↓
2009–10	Kreisliga-2-Straubing	IX	8th
2010–11	Kreisliga-2-Straubing	IX	12th ↓
2011–12	Kreisklasse Straubing 1	X	4th
2012–13	Kreisklasse Straubing 1	IX	14th ↓

- With the introduction of the Bezirksoberligas in 1988 as the new fifth tier, below the Landesligas, all leagues below dropped one tier. With the introduction of the Regionalligas in 1994 and the 3. Liga in 2008 as the new third tier, below the 2. Bundesliga, all leagues below dropped one tier. With the establishment of the Regionalliga Bayern as the new fourth tier in Bavaria in 2012 the Bayernliga was split into a northern and a southern division, the number of Landesligas expanded from three to five and the Bezirksoberligas abolished. All leagues from the Bezirksligas onward were elevated one tier.

↑ Promoted	↓ Relegated
