= SpVgg Ruhmannsfelden =

German football club

- Full name: Spielvereinigung Ruhmannsfelden-Zachenberg 1946 e.V.
- Founded: 1946
- Ground: Lerchenfeldstadion
- Chairman: Alois Zeiner
- Manager: Wolfgang Kammerl
- League: Landesliga Bayern (VI)
- 2015–16: Bayernliga Süd (V), 18th (relegated)
Home colours

SpVgg Ruhmannsfelden is a German association football club from the municipality of Ruhmannsfelden, Bavaria. The club's greatest success has been promotion to the tier five Bayernliga in 2015.

== History ==
SpVgg Ruhmannsfelden was formed after the Second World War, in 1946.

Long an amateur side in local football SpVgg Ruhmannsfelden first rose above the Lower Bavarian football level when it won promotion to the tier four Landesliga Bayern-Mitte in 1984. Coming last in the league in 1984–85 the club promptly dropped back down but won promotion for a second time in 1988. It lasted for two seasons this time, coming thirteenth in 1989 but last once more the season after.

Following relegation from the Landesliga, Ruhmannsfelden spent the next twenty two seasons in either the Bezirksoberliga Niederbayern, a league established in 1988, or the Bezirksliga below, with the exception of a three-year stint in the A-Klasse from 1994. Relegation so from the Bezirksoberliga in 1992 and 2003 were followed by promotions back to the league in 1998 and 2006. Generally the club played as a mid table side in the Bezirksoberliga and only came close to promotion back to the Landesliga once, when it finished runners-up in 2009 but failed to earn promotion. In 2012, with the reorganisation of the Bavarian league system Ruhmannsfelden had the opportunity to qualify for the Landesliga despite having finished only eleventh in the Bezirksoberliga. The club was successful at this by defeating SV Schalding-Heining II and FC Vilshofen and returned to Landesliga football from 2012.

From 2012 he club became part of the new Landesliga Bayern-Mitte, a league different in territory from the old Landesliga Mitte. Ruhmannsfelden played as a mid table side in its first two seasons there but won the league in 2014–15 and earned promotion to the southern division of the Bayernliga for the first time. The club came last in the Bayernliga in 2015–16 and was relegated back to the Landesliga.

== Honours ==
The club's honours:

- Landesliga Bayern-Mitte
  - Champions: 2015
- Bezirksoberliga Niederbayern
  - Runners-up: 2009
- Bezirksliga Niederbayern-Ost
  - Champions: 1981, 1998, 2006

== Recent seasons ==
The recent season-by-season performance of the club:

Season	Division	Tier	Position
2003–04	Bezirksliga Niederbayern-Ost	VII	5th
2004–05	Bezirksliga Niederbayern-Ost	VII	7th
2005–06	Bezirksliga Niederbayern-Ost	VII	1st↑
2006–07	Bezirksoberliga Niederbayern	VI	7th
2007–08	Bezirksoberliga Niederbayern	VI	5th
2008–09	Bezirksoberliga Niederbayern	VII	2nd
2009–10	Bezirksoberliga Niederbayern	VII	10th
2010–11	Bezirksoberliga Niederbayern	VII	10th
2011–12	Bezirksoberliga Niederbayern	VII	11th ↑
2012–13	Landesliga Bayern-Mitte	VI	7th
2013–14	Landesliga Bayern-Mitte	VI	10th
2014–15	Landesliga Bayern-Mitte	VI	1st ↑
2015–16	Bayernliga Süd	V	18th ↓
2016–17	Landesliga Bayern	VI	

- With the introduction of the Regionalligas in 1994 and the 3. Liga in 2008 as the new third tier, below the 2. Bundesliga, all leagues below dropped one tier.

↑ Promoted	↓ Relegated
