= DJK Vilzing =

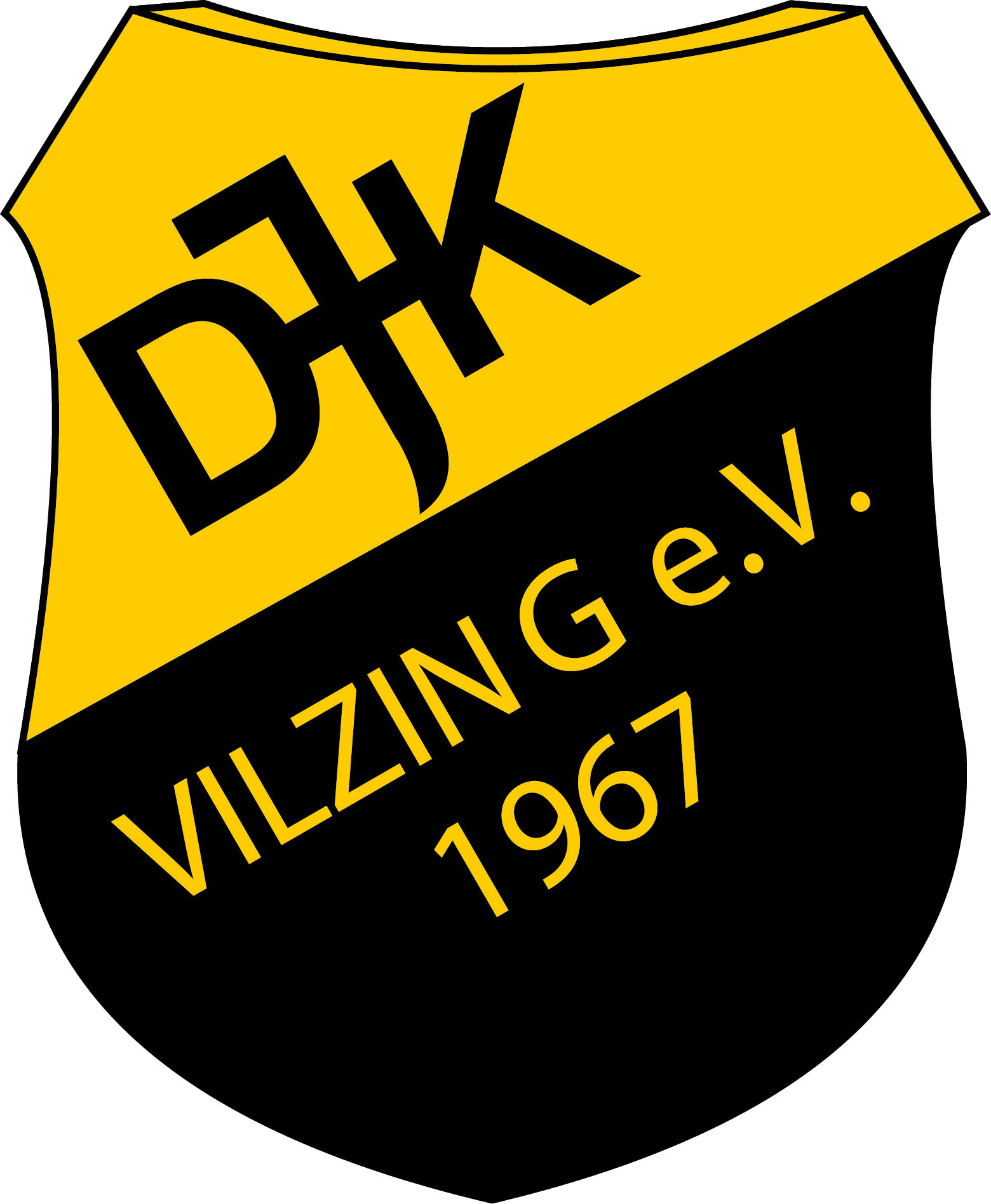
- Full name: Deutsche Jugendkraft Vilzing 1967 e. V.
- Founded: 1967
- Ground: Manfred-Zollner-Stadion
- Capacity: 3,480
- Chairman: Klaus Kernbichl
- Manager: Thorsten Kirschbaum
- League: Regionalliga Bayern (IV)
- 2025–26: Regionalliga Bayern, 5th of 18
Home colours

DJK Vilzing is a German association football club from the village of Vilzing, located near Cham, Bavaria. DJK stands for Deutsche Jugendkraft, a sports organisation associated with the Catholic Church.

The club's greatest success came in 2022 when it qualified for the Regionalliga, the fourth tier of the German football league system.

== History ==
For much of the first 30 years of its history the club had been a non-descript amateur side in local Bavarian football until a championship in the Bezirksliga Oberpfalz-Süd in 1998, a league which the club had played in since 1995, earned it promotion to the Bezirksoberliga.

Playing in the Bezirksoberliga Oberpfalz for two seasons from 1998 to 2000 DJK came fourth in its first season there, followed by a league championship and promotion the year after. A six-year stint in the Landesliga Bayern-Mitte followed in which the club, after three difficult first seasons finished in the top four in 2004 and 2005. However, in the 2005–06 season Vilzing came sixteenth and was relegated back to the Bezirksoberliga.

Another league championship the following year saw the club move back up to the Landesliga and come third in its first season back. Vilzings results gradually worsened season after season, resulting in another relegation from the league in 2011. The club played the 2011–12 season in the Bezirksoberliga once more, which was also going to be the last for this league. The Bezirksoberligas were disbanded in 2012 and the Landesligas expanded from three to five divisions, allowing the club to move up to the Landesliga once more despite finishing only fourth.

DJK entered the Landesliga Bayern-Mitte once more but this league now covered a much smaller area then the previous league which had existed from 1963 to 2012. In its inaugural season the club came second but failed to achieve Bayernliga qualification in the promotion round. The second season saw Vilzing repeat this result but this time it succeeded in the promotion round and qualified for the southern division of the Bayernliga for 2014–15. The club remained in the Bayernliga until it won promotion to the Regionalliga Bayern as champions in 2022.

== Honours ==
The club's honours:

=== League ===
- Bayernliga Nord
  - Champions: 2022
  - Runners-up: 2020, 2021
- Landesliga Bayern-Mitte
  - Runners-up: 2013, 2014
- Bezirksoberliga Oberpfalz
  - Champions: 2000, 2007
- Bezirksliga Oberpfalz-Süd
  - Champions: 1998

=== Cup ===
- Oberpfalz Cup
  - Runners-up: 2007

== Players ==
As of 8 September 2026

Note: Flags indicate national team as defined under FIFA eligibility rules; some limited exceptions apply. Players may hold more than one non-FIFA nationality.

No.	Pos.	Nation	Player
1	GK	GER	Fabian Eutinger
2	DF	HUN	Levente Ráki
3	DF	FRA	Alexis Fambo
4	DF	GER	Elija Härtl
5	MF	GER	Paul Grauschopf
6	DF	GER	Mario Kufner
7	FW	GER	Benedikt Fisher
8	MF	GER	Simon Sedlaczek
9	FW	GER	Andreas Jünger
10	MF	GER	Nik Leipold
11	FW	GER	Markus Ziereis
12	GK	GER	Dominik Huljak
13	DF	BUL	Martin Mihaylov

No.	Pos.	Nation	Player
14	MF	GER	Josef Gottmeier
17	DF	GER	Jonas Blümel
19	MF	GER	Jonas Goß
21	MF	GER	Max Meyer
26	DF	GER	Benedikt Auburger
27	MF	GER	Ahmet Emir Altay
28	FW	TUR	Erol Özbay
30	FW	GER	Benedikt Laumer
32	FW	GER	Fabian Ziegler
33	GK	GER	Sandro Weber
36	DF	GER	Jakob Zitzelsberger
40	DF	GER	Martin Tiefenbrunner
-	FW	GER	Daniel Steininger

== Recent seasons ==
The recent season-by-season performance of the club:

Season	Division	Tier	Position
1999–2000	Bezirksoberliga Oberpfalz	VI	1st ↑
2000–01	Landesliga Bayern-Mitte	V	11th
2001–02	Landesliga Bayern-Mitte	V	14th
2002–03	Landesliga Bayern-Mitte	V	14th
2003–04	Landesliga Bayern-Mitte	V	3rd
2004–05	Landesliga Bayern-Mitte	V	4th
2005–06	Landesliga Bayern-Mitte	V	16th ↓
2006–07	Bezirksoberliga Oberpfalz	VI	1st ↑
2007–08	Landesliga Bayern-Mitte	V	3rd
2008–09	Landesliga Bayern-Mitte	VI	5th
2009–10	Landesliga Bayern-Mitte	VI	8th
2010–11	Landesliga Bayern-Mitte	VI	17th ↓
2011–12	Bezirksoberliga Oberpfalz	VII	4th ↑
2012–13	Landesliga Bayern-Mitte	VI	2nd
2013–14	Landesliga Bayern-Mitte	VI	2nd ↑
2014–15	Bayernliga Süd	V	5th
2015–16	Bayernliga Süd	V	12th
2016–17	Bayernliga Süd	V	6th
2017–18	Bayernliga Süd	V	7th
2018–19	Bayernliga Süd	V	5th
2019–20	Bayernliga Nord	V	2nd
2020–21	Bayernliga Nord	V	2nd
2021–22	Bayernliga Nord	V	1st ↑
2022–23	Regionalliga Bayern	IV	13th
2023–24	Regionalliga Bayern	IV	2nd
2024–25	Regionalliga Bayern	IV	9th
2025–26	Regionalliga Bayern	IV	5th

- With the introduction of the Bezirksoberligas in 1988 as the new fifth tier, below the Landesligas, all leagues below dropped one tier. With the introduction of the Regionalligas in 1994 and the 3. Liga in 2008 as the new third tier, below the 2. Bundesliga, all leagues below dropped one tier. With the establishment of the Regionalliga Bayern as the new fourth tier in Bavaria in 2012 the Bayernliga was split into a northern and a southern division, the number of Landesligas expanded from three to five and the Bezirksoberligas abolished. All leagues from the Bezirksligas onwards were elevated one tier.

=== Key ===
↑ Promoted	↓ Relegated
