= SpVgg Grün-Weiss Deggendorf =

German football club

- Full name: Spielvereinigung Grün-Weiss Deggendorf 03 e.V.
- Founded: 30 April 2003
- Ground: Donau-Wald-Stadion
- Capacity: 6,000
- Chairman: Franz Liebl
- Manager: Barbaros Yalçin
- League: Bezirksliga Niederbayern-Ost (VII)
- 2015–16: 11th
Home colours	Away colours

The SpVgg Grün-Weiss Deggendorf is a German association football club from the town of Deggendorf, Bavaria.

SpVgg Grün-Weiss Deggendorf was formed in 2003 in a merger of SpVgg Deggendorf and SV Grün-Weiss Deggendorf. Of those two clubs SpVgg Deggendorf was by far the more successful, having spent eight seasons in the third tier Bayernliga between 1953 and 1962. The new club's greatest success came in 2012 when it qualified for the new southern division of the expanded Bayernliga, now the fifth tier of the German football league system, but the club lasted for only one season at this level.

== History ==
=== Previous clubs ===
SpVgg Deggendorf was formed in February 1920 and was the older and more successful of the two clubs who would eventually merge. SpVgg made its first appearance at Bavarian state level in 1953 after winning the 2nd Amateurliga Niederbayern. The club spent the following five seasons in the southern division of the Bayernliga with a fifth place in 1955 as its best result. Relegation followed in 1958 but SpVgg made an immediate return and spend another three seasons in the Bayernliga. It was finally relegated from the Bayernliga in 1962 and would not return to this league again under that name.

The club became a founding member of the Landesliga Bayern-Mitte in 1963 but was relegated at the end of the inaugural season of the league. SpVgg spend the next eight seasons in leagues below the Landesliga, dropping as far as the A-Klasse between 1967 and 1969, but made a return in 1972. It would spend the next eleven seasons in the Landesliga with a third place in 1973–74 as its best result. However, in 1983 the club was relegated from the Landesliga and, after this, spend only two brief seasons at this level again, in 1988–89 and 1993–94. The other seasons between 1988 and 1995 the club spent in the Bezirksoberliga Niederbayern, where it finished second on three consecutive occasions before finally winning the league in 1993 and earning promotion. After its last Landesliga stint in 1994 it was relegated from the Bezirksoberliga, too, in 1995 and disappeared from top-level amateur football for a number of years. The club dropped as far as the B-Klasse in 1997–98, the only time the two future merger clubs would play in the same league, but immediately recovered and returned to higher levels. Only in 2002 did it return to the Bezirksoberliga where it finished second in the club's last season.

SV Grün-Weiß Deggendorf was formed on 9 November 1968. It never rose above local league football, the C and B-Klasse, during its 35-year history.

=== SpVgg Grün-Weiss Deggendorf ===
SpVgg Grün-Weiss Deggendorf was formed on 30 April 2003 when SpVgg and SV Grün-Weiss Deggendorf merged.

Courtesy to SpVgg Deggendorf's second place in the Bezirksoberliga Niederbayern in 2002–03 the new club was promoted to the Landesliga Mitte but lasted for only one season there. Back in the Bezirksoberliga it won this league in 2004–05 and returned to the Landesliga but once more was relegated straight away again.

Deggendorf played the next two seasons in the Bezirksoberliga Niederbayern again, coming second in 2007 and winning the league again in 2008. The later allowed to club to move up to the Landesliga again. A more successful stint at this level now followed, with a fifth place in 2011–12 as its best result. This allowed the club automatic qualification to the expanded Bayernliga, entering the new southern division.

SpVgg GW Deggendorf however lasted for only one season in the Bayernliga before being relegated back to the Landesliga, now to the new Landesliga Mitte, a league sharing the name with the old Landesliga Mitte but covering a different and smaller area. In 2015 the club suffered another relegation, now to the Bezirksliga.

== Honours ==
The club's honours:

=== SpVgg Grün-Weiss Deggendorf ===
- Bezirksoberliga Niederbayern
  - Champions: 2005, 2008
  - Runners-up: 2007

=== SpVgg Deggendorf ===
- Bezirksoberliga Niederbayern
  - Champions: 1993
  - Runners-up: 1990, 1991, 1992, 2003
- 2nd Amateurliga Niederbayern
  - Champions: 1953, 1959

== Recent seasons ==
The season-by-season performance of the club since the merger in 2003:

Season	Division	Tier	Position
2003–04	Landesliga Bayern-Mitte	V	17th ↓
2004–05	Bezirksoberliga Niederbayern	VI	1st ↑
2005–06	Landesliga Bayern-Mitte	V	17th ↓
2006–07	Bezirksoberliga Niederbayern	VI	2nd
2007–08	Bezirksoberliga Niederbayern	VI	1st ↑
2008–09	Landesliga Bayern-Mitte	VI	9th
2009–10	Landesliga Bayern-Mitte	VI	9th
2010–11	Landesliga Bayern-Mitte	VI	8th
2011–12	Landesliga Bayern-Mitte	VI	5th ↑
2012–13	Bayernliga Süd	V	16th ↓
2013–14	Landesliga Bayern-Mitte	VI	12th
2014–15	Landesliga Bayern-Mitte	VI	15th ↓
2015–16	Bezirksliga Niederbayern-Ost	VII	11th
2016–17	Bezirksliga Niederbayern-Ost	VII	

- With the introduction of the Bezirksoberligas in 1988 as the new fifth tier, below the Landesligas, all leagues below dropped one tier. With the introduction of the Regionalligas in 1994 and the 3. Liga in 2008 as the new third tier, below the 2. Bundesliga, all leagues below dropped one tier. With the establishment of the Regionalliga Bayern as the new fourth tier in Bavaria in 2012 the Bayernliga was split into a northern and a southern division, the number of Landesligas expanded from three to five and the Bezirksoberligas abolished. All leagues from the Bezirksligas onwards were elevated one tier.

↑ Promoted	↓ Relegated
