= FC Amberg =

German football club

- Full name: Fußball Club Amberg e.V.
- Founded: Original: 1921 Reformed: 1995
- Ground: Stadion am Schanzl
- Capacity: 9,000
- Manager: Günter Brandl
- League: Bezirksliga Oberpfalz-Nord (VII)
- 2017–18: Bayernliga Nord (V), 18th (relegated)
- Website: http://www.fcamberg.com
Home colours	Away colours

FC Amberg is a German football club from the city of Amberg, Bavaria. The team was established on 6 April 1921 as Amberg Fußballverein and on 17 January 1939 adopted the name Verein für Leibesübungen Amberg.

== History ==
Following World War II on 9 November 1945 the club merged with Turnverein 1861 Amberg to form Turn- und Spielverein Amberg. The union was short-lived and the two clubs went their separate ways on 15 July 1949 with the former VfL reorganizing as 1. FC Amberg. The club won the local Oberpfalz championship in 1948 and originally qualified for the new Amateurliga, but, because it used an ineligible player, it was denied promotion.

The Amberger side first came to note in the 1951–52 season, capturing the Amateurliga Bayern (III) title, but failing in their attempt to advance through a promotion playoff to the 2. Oberliga Süd. The club lost the 1956 title to ESV Ingolstadt, losing a decider 1–0. A sixteenth-place finish in 1963 spelled the end to their twelve-year membership to the league, and they did not appear in third-tier play again for more than two decades until they returned to the Amateurliga in 1975, where they would compete until sent down in 1982, a second place in 1979 being their best finish.

They again made their way back in 1986 to what in 1978 had become the Amateuroberliga Bayern (III) and played there as a middling side until 1991. The club made its only appearance in DFB-Pokal (German Cup) in the opening round of the 1987 tournament, going out 0–7 to Bundesliga side Borussia Mönchengladbach. In 1994–95 Amberg made its last appearance in upper tier regional play, in the Oberliga Bayern (IV). The club folded after this, being DM1.7 million in debt.

A new club was formed within the TV Amberg, the FC Amberg. This new club started to make a recovery from the lower reaches of Bavarian amateur football in the early 2000s, reaching the level below the Oberliga, the Landesliga, in 2003 once more. For a number of years Amberg played as a mid-table side in the Landesliga Bayern Mitte (VI) before a loss in the relegation round in 2011 caused the club to drop back to the Bezirksoberliga.

Changes in the league system in 2012 meant that the club, after a championship in the Bezirksoberliga, qualified for the promotion round to the newly expanded Bayernliga and managed to return to this level after victories over 1. FC Bad Kötzting and Dergah Spor Nürnberg. Amberg finished fourth in the Bayernliga in each of its first two seasons back. In the 2014–15 season the club finished runners-up and thereby qualified for the promotion round to the Regionalliga Bayern where it won promotion after two victories over VfR Garching. Amberg came second-last in the Regionalliga in 2015–16 and was relegated again.

== Honors ==
The club's honours:

=== League ===
- Amateurliga Bayern (III)
  - Champions: 1952
- Bayernliga Nord
  - Runners-up: 2015
- Landesliga Bayern-Mitte (IV)
  - Champions: (2) 1975, 1986
  - Runners-up: (3) 1965, 1969, 1994
- Bezirksoberliga Oberpfalz (VI)
  - Champions: (3) 2003, 2005, 2012
- Bezirksliga Oberpfalz-Nord (VII)
  - Champions: 2002
- Oberpfalz championship
  - Winners: (2) 1948, 1951

== Recent seasons ==
The recent season-by-season performance of the club:

Year	Division	Tier	Position
2000–01	Kreisliga	VIII	↑
2001–02	Bezirksliga Oberpfalz-Nord	VII	1st ↑
2002–03	Bezirksoberliga Oberpfalz	VI	1st ↑
2003–04	Landesliga Bayern-Mitte	V	16th ↓
2004–05	Bezirksoberliga Oberpfalz	VI	1st ↑
2005–06	Landesliga Bayern-Mitte	V	7th
2006–07	Landesliga Bayern-Mitte	V	15th
2007–08	Landesliga Bayern-Mitte	V	13th
2008–09	Landesliga Bayern-Mitte	VI	8th
2009–10	Landesliga Bayern-Mitte	VI	10th
2010–11	Landesliga Bayern-Mitte	VI	15th ↓
2011–12	Bezirksoberliga Oberpfalz	VII	1st ↑
2012–13	Bayernliga Nord	V	4th
2013–14	Bayernliga Nord	V	4th
2014–15	Bayernliga Nord	V	2nd ↑
2015–16	Regionalliga Bayern	IV	17th ↓
2016–17	Bayernliga Nord	V	10th
2017–18	Bayernliga Nord	V	18th ↓↓

- With the introduction of the Bezirksoberligas in 1988 as the new fifth tier, below the Landesligas, all leagues below dropped one tier. With the introduction of the Regionalligas in 1994 and the 3. Liga in 2008 as the new third tier, below the 2. Bundesliga, all leagues below dropped one tier. With the establishment of the Regionalliga Bayern as the new fourth tier in Bavaria in 2012 the Bayernliga was split into a northern and a southern division, the number of Landesligas expanded from three to five and the Bezirksoberligas abolished. All leagues from the Bezirksligas onwards were elevated one tier.

↑ Promoted	↓ Relegated

== DFB Cup appearances ==
The club has qualified for the first round of the German Cup only once:

Season	Round	Date	Home	Away	Result	Attendance
DFB-Pokal 1986–87	First round	27 August 1986	1. FC Amberg	Borussia Mönchengladbach	0–7	

Source:"DFB-Pokal" (in German). Weltfussball.de.
