= FC Vilshofen =

German football club

- Full name: Fussballclub Vilshofen e.V. 1919
- Founded: 1919
- Manager: Christian Dullinger
- League: Kreisliga Passau (VIII)
- 2015–16: 2nd
Home colours	Away colours

The FC Vilshofen is a German association football club from the town of Vilshofen an der Donau, Bavaria.

The club's most successful era was from 1978 to 1985, when it spent six seasons in the tier three Fußball-Bayernliga, with a ninth place in this league as its best result. They also reached the first round of the German Cup in 1979–80, where it lost 2–3 to FV Würzburg 04 after extra time.

Their youth team reached the final of the Bavarian Under 19 championship twice in the 1970s and produced players like former German international Klaus Augenthaler.

== History ==
FC Vilshofen was formed in 1919 and rose above local play in 1973, when it achieved promotion to the tier four Landesliga Bayern-Mitte. In this league, Vilshofen spent the next five seasons, the first three of them struggling against relegation before taking out the league championship in 1977–78 and gaining entry to the Bayernliga. The club's first two seasons at this level were however a struggle and it was relegated at the end of the 1979–80 season.

In 1980–81, Vilshofen was immediately promoted from the Landesliga back to the Bayernliga again. Back in the Bayernliga, the club finished in ninth place for two consecutive seasons. After this, fortunes declined and the side finished 13th and 17th in the following years, finding itself relegated from the league again after the later result.

The club also had a number of cup successes in this era, taking out the Lower Bavarian Cup in 1982, 1983 and 1984 after having qualified for the first round of the German Cup in 1979.

After relegation in 1985, the club spent another ten seasons at Landesliga level, initially as an upper table side. But in 1994–95, the team suffered another relegation, dropping out of the Landesliga for good.

Vilshofen now entered the Bezirksoberliga Niederbayern, where it became a mid-table side. Gradually, the club declined at this level and suffered another relegation, now to the Bezirksliga, in 2001.

The club dropped even further in the following season to the Kreisliga, but immediately recovered and returned to the Bezirksliga. After five seasons at this level, the team won a league championship and earned another promotion.

They returned to the Bezirksoberliga in 2008 with a much better performance then it left it seven years before, finishing consistently in the top third of the league and coming second in 2009–10. At the end of the 2011–12 season the club qualified for the promotion round to the newly expanded Landesliga, after finishing eighth in the Bezirksoberliga. FCV qualified for the Landesliga after a 4–1 extra time win in the third round of the promotion play-offs.

The club lasted for only one season in the Landesliga, finishing on a relegation play-off rank and losing to TuS Pfarrkirchen in the relegation round. The following season it suffered relegation again, now to the Kreisliga.

== Honours ==
The club's honours:

=== League ===
- Landesliga Bayern-Mitte
  - Champions: 1978, 1981
- Bezirksoberliga Niederbayern
  - Runners-up: 2010
- Bezirksliga Niederbayern-Ost
  - Champions: 2008

=== Cup ===
- Niederbayern Cup
  - Winner: 1982, 1983, 1984

=== Youth ===
- Bavarian Under 19 championship
  - Runners-up: 1971, 1975

== Recent seasons ==
The recent season-by-season performance of the club:

Season	Division	Tier	Position
1999–2000	Bezirksoberliga Niederbayern	VI	12th
2000–01	Bezirksoberliga Niederbayern	VI	16th ↓
2001–02	Bezirksliga Niederbayern-Ost	VII	14th ↓
2002–03	Kreisliga	VIII	↑
2003–04	Bezirksliga Niederbayern-Ost	VII	3rd
2004–05	Bezirksliga Niederbayern-Ost	VII	4th
2005–06	Bezirksliga Niederbayern-Ost	VII	7th
2006–07	Bezirksliga Niederbayern-Ost	VII	3rd
2007–08	Bezirksliga Niederbayern-Ost	VII	1st ↑
2008–09	Bezirksoberliga Niederbayern	VII	6th
2009–10	Bezirksoberliga Niederbayern	VII	2nd
2010–11	Bezirksoberliga Niederbayern	VII	4th
2011–12	Bezirksoberliga Niederbayern	VII	8th ↑
2012–13	Landesliga Bayern-Südost	VI	14th ↓
2013–14	Bezirksliga Niederbayern-West	VII	15th ↓
2014–15	Kreisliga Passau	VIII	6th
2015–16	Kreisliga Passau	VIII	2nd
2016–17	Kreisliga Passau	VIII	

- With the introduction of the Bezirksoberligas in 1988 as the new fifth tier, below the Landesligas, all leagues below dropped one tier. With the introduction of the Regionalligas in 1994 and the 3. Liga in 2008 as the new third tier, below the 2. Bundesliga, all leagues below dropped one tier. With the establishment of the Regionalliga Bayern as the new fourth tier in Bavaria in 2012 the Bayernliga was split into a northern and a southern division, the number of Landesligas expanded from three to five and the Bezirksoberligas abolished. All leagues from the Bezirksligas onward were elevated one tier.

↑ Promoted	↓ Relegated

== DFB Cup appearances ==
The club has qualified for the first round of the German Cup just once:

Season	Round	Date	Home	Away	Result	Attendance
1979–80	First round	25 August 1979	FC Vilshofen	FV Würzburg 04	2–3 aet	1,800
