= Bezirksoberliga Niederbayern =

- Founded: 1988
- Folded: 2012
- Country: Germany
- State: Bavaria
- Level on pyramid: Level 7
- Promotion to: Landesliga Mitte
- Relegation to: Bezirksliga West; Bezirksliga Ost
- Last champions: ETSV 09 Landshut (2011–12)

The Bezirksoberliga Niederbayern was the seventh tier of the German football league system in the Bavarian Regierungsbezirk of Lower Bavaria (German: Niederbayern). Until the introduction of the 3. Liga in 2008 it was the sixth tier of the league system, until the introduction of the Regionalligas in 1994 the fifth tier.

The league was disbanded at the end of the 2011–12 season, when major changes to the Bavarian football league system were carried out. Above the Bezirksoberligas, the Landesligas were expanded in number from three to five divisions and the Bezirke have two to three regional leagues, the Bezirksligas, as its highest level again, similar to the system in place until 1988.

== Overview ==
The Bezirksoberligas in Bavaria were introduced in 1988 to create a highest single-division playing level for each of the seven Bezirke.

Before the introduction of the Bezirksoberligas, the Bezirksliga was the level of play below the Landesliga. The Bezirksliga Niederbayern-Ost and Niederbayern-West fed the Landesliga Bayern-Mitte as they afterwards fed the Bezirksoberliga Niederbayern.

The winner of the Bezirksoberliga Niederbayern, like the winner of the Bezirksoberliga Oberpfalz and Bezirksoberliga Mittelfranken, was directly promoted to the Landesliga Bayern-Mitte. The second placed teams out of those leagues played-off for another promotion spot with the 15th placed team out of the Landesliga for the last spot there. However, in some years additional promotion places were available in the Landesliga.

The three bottom teams of the Bezirksoberliga were relegated to the Bezirksliga, the team just above those faced a play-off against the second placed Bezirksliga teams.

With the league reform at the end of the 2011–12 season, which includes an expansion of the number of Landesligas from three to five, the Bezirksoberligas were disbanded. Instead, the Bezirksligas took the place of the Bezirksoberligas below the Landesligas once more.

The clubs from the Bezirksoberliga joined the following leagues:

- Champions : Promotion round to the Bayernliga, winners to the Bayernliga, losers to the Landesliga.
- Teams placed 2nd to 6th: Directly qualified to the Landesliga.
- Teams placed 7th to 12th: Three additional Landesliga places to be determined in a play-off round with the Bezirksliga champions, losers enter Bezirksliga.
- Teams placed 13th to 16th: Directly relegated to Bezirksliga.

== Winners and runners-up ==
The following teams have won or finished runners-up in the league:

**Season**	**Champions**	**Runners-up**
1988–89	**TV Freyung**	TSV Straubing
1989–90	**1. FC Bad Kötzting**	SpVgg Deggendorf
1990–91	**SV Landau/Isar**	SpVgg Deggendorf
1991–92	**TSV Waldkirchen**	SpVgg Deggendorf
1992–93	**SpVgg Deggendorf**	SV Landau/Isar
1993–94	**SV Landau/Isar**	**TuS Landshut-Berg** ^{+}
1994–95	SV Schalding-Heining ^{1}	**SV Hutthurm**
1995–96	**TSV Straubing**	SV Riedlhütte
1996–97	**SV Riedelhütte**	SV Schalding-Heining
1997–98	**1. FC Miltach**	**TuS Landshut–Berg**
1998–99	**SV Schalding-Heining**	**TSV Ergoldsbach**
1999–2000	**TSV Rotthalmünster**	FC Dingolfing
2000–01	**SpVgg Hankofen-Hailing**	**FC Dingolfing**
2001–02	**SV Perlesreut**	SV Ettenkofen
2002–03	**FC Dingolfing**	**SpVgg Deggendorf**
2003–04	**ETSV 09 Landshut**	SpVgg Kirchdorf
2004–05	**SpVgg GW Deggendorf**	**SpVgg Kirchdorf**
2005–06	**1. FC Miltach**	TV Schierling
2006–07	**SpVgg Hankofen-Hailing**	SpVgg GW Deggendorf
2007–08	**SpVgg GW Deggendorf**	**ASC Simbach**
2008–09	**TV Schierling**	SpVgg Ruhmannsfelden
2009–10	**SpVgg Hankofen-Hailing**	FC Vilshofen
2010–11	**FC Ergolding**	1. FC Passau
2011–12	**ETSV 09 Landshut**	**TSV Waldkirchen**

- Promoted teams in **bold**.
- ^{+} Teams finished on equal points, decider needed to determine final position.
- ^{1} In 1995, the SV Hutthurm (2nd) and TSV Velden (3rd) were promoted instead of the champions SV Schalding–Heining, the later having declined promotion.

=== Multiple winners ===
The following clubs have won the league more than once:

**Club**	**Wins**	**Years**
SpVgg Hankofen-Hailing	3	2001, 2007, 2010
SpVgg GW Deggendorf	3	1993, 2005, 2008
ETSV 09 Landshut	2	2004, 2012
1. FC Miltach	2	1996, 2008
SV Schalding-Heining	2	1995, 1999
SV Landau/Isar	2	1991, 1994

== League placings ==
The final placings in the league since its interception:

Club	S	89	90	91	92	93	94	95	96	97	98	99	00	01	02	03	04	05	06	07	08	09	10	11	12
SV Schalding-Heining	5							1	3	2	3	1	L	L	L	L	L	L	L	L	L	L	B	B	L
1. FC Bad Kötzting	2	5	1	L	L	L	L	L	L	L	L	L	L	L	L	L	L	B	B	B	B	B	B	L	L
SpVgg G-W Deggendorf ^{1}	4															2	L	1	L	2	1	L	L	L	L
SpVgg Hankofen-Hailing	6											6	4	1	L	L	L	L	L	1	L	11	1	L	L
FC Ergolding	9	13	12	16		14														6	13	7	8	1	L
ETSV Landshut	17	4	11	9	10	10	7	11	5	12	13	16				4	1	L	9	16		14			1
TSV Waldkirchen	20	9	5	7	1	L	9	4	4	8	9	14		11	14			3	3	3	3	8	7	5	2
TSV Bogen	2																							6	3
TV Schierling	8												16					10	2	8	12	1	L	3	4
SpVgg Plattling	5	L	B	B	B	L	B	L	16						4	6	16								5
1. FC Passau	5	L	L	L	L	B	B	B	B	B	B	B	B	L	L	L	B	B	B	L	8	4	6	2	6
FC Dingolfing	8	12	16								8	3	2	2	L	1	L	L	L	L	L	L	L	L	7
FC Vilshofen	10	L	L	L	L	L	L	L	9	7	6	12	12	16								6	2	4	8
ASC Simbach	9		14														7	8	11	12	2	L	9	11	9
SpVgg Lam	16								12	6	14		13	9	10	5	6	13	10	4	7	9	4	7	10
SpVgg Ruhmannsfelden	13	L	L	11	16							9	8	7	5	16				7	5	2	10	10	11
TSV Regen	15			4	12	7	14				7	5	6	4	9	8	12	16					11	12	12
TV Freyung	10	1	L	5	11	9	11	8	14														5	9	13
ASV Steinach	2																							13	14
SV Hutthurm	13				5	11	3	2	L	L	L	L	L	L	L	L	3	5	7	5	4	5	3	8	15
1. FC Miltach	8	L	L	L	L	L	L	L	L	L	1	L	L	L	3	3	4	4	1	L	14				16
TSV Grafenau	3																		6	15				14	
TSV Mauth	16					5	6	7	11	11	10	4	5	15				6	5	10	6	3	12	15	
FC Salzweg	1																							16	
ETSV Hainsbach	1																						13		
SC Zwiesel	15	15					12	12	7	5	12	15			6	11	5	12	14		10	10	14		
SV Bernried	2																					12	15		
SpVgg Kirchdorf	4																2	2	L	L	L	13	16		
FC Wallersdorf	6								15			13	10	13							9	15			
FC Dingolfing II	3																		4	11	11				
SV Auerbach	2																			13	15				
SSV Eggenfelden	3																		12	9	16				
TSV Straubing	11	2	4	8	7	8	5	10	1	L	L	L	L	L	15				8	14					
SV Perlesreut	5													10	1	L	10	7	13						
SV Ihrlerstein	4									9	15							9	15						
TSV Rotthalmünster	9									3	4	7	1	L	12	10	8	11	16						
DJK Neßelbach	2																9	14							
SV Prackenbach	3															9	11	15							
RSV Walchsing	2															12	13								
SV Aicha	6											11	7	6	11	7	14								
FC Eging	7								6	13			11	8	8	13	15								
SV Ettenkofen	4												9	5	2	14									
FC Künzing	5										11	10	14		7	15									
SV Ascha	2													12	13										
TuS Landshut-Berg	4						2	L	L	L	2	L	3	3											
TSV Ergoldsbach	2											2	L	14											
SV Riedelhütte	3							5	2	1	L	L	L												
FC Ruderting	12	3	3	12	6	4	10	6	10	4	5	8	15												
SV Landau	5	11	7	1	L	2	1	L	L	L	L	L													
TSV Velden	6				13	13	4	3	L	10	16														
SpVgg Hackelberg	7	7	10	10	3	3	15			14															
TSV Eichendorf	2								13	15															
TSV-DJK Oberdiendorf	6				9	6	8	9	8	16															
FC Sturm Hauzenberg	2						13	13																	
SpVgg Deggendorf ^{1}	5	L	2	2	2	1	L	14																	
SpVgg Landshut II	1							15																	
ATSV Kelheim	2			15				16																	
TSV Natternberg	2					12	16																		
SV Winzer	4		6	3	4	15																			
SV Neukirchen-Steinberg	2				8	16																			
SC Rain	3	14		6	14																				
DJK/TSV Dietfurt	4	8	9	13	15																				
FC Auenkirchen	1	L	L	14																					
FC Otterskirchen	2		8	17																					
SV Saal	2	6	13																						
SpVgg Osterhofen	2	10	15																						
SV Neukirchen Heilig Blut	1	16																							

=== Key ===
Color	Key
B	Bayernliga
L	Landesliga Mitte
1, 2, 3, ...	Bezirksoberliga
1	League champions
	Played at a league level below this league

- S = No of seasons in league (as of 2011-12)

=== Notes ===
- ^{1} In 2003 the SpVgg Grün-Weiss Deggendorf was formed through a merger of SpVgg Deggendorf and SV Grün-Weiss Deggendorf.
