= ASV Burglengenfeld =

German football club

- Full name: Allgemeiner Sportverein Burglengenfeld e.V.
- Founded: 1945
- Ground: Naabtalpark
- Manager: Matthias Bösl
- League: Landesliga Bayern-Mitte (VI)
- 2015–16: Bayernliga Nord (V), 15th (relegated)
Home colours	Away colours

ASV Burglengenfeld is a German association football club from the town of Burglengenfeld, Bavaria. The club's greatest success has been its three participations in the DFB-Pokal, the German Cup, reaching the second round on one occasion, as well as promotion to the tier five Bayernliga in 2015.

== History ==
ASV Burglengenfeld was formed in 1945 but sees its roots in the Freien Turn- und Sportverein Burglengenfeld, a club adored by the Nazis in 1933.

The club played in the tier five Bezirksliga Oberpfalz from 1964 to 1971, generally achieving good results and eventually earning promotion in 1971 after a runners-up finish.

ASV played three seasons in the tier four Landesliga Bayern-Mitte from 1971 to 1974, finishing ninth in its first year there but than declining and being relegated again after an eighteenth place in 1973–74. The club spent three seasons in the Bezirksliga before making a return to the Landesliga in 1977. It entered its most successful era in both league and cup competitions, spending the next eight seasons in this league. The club finished in fourth place in its first two Landesliga seasons before dropping to the lower end of the table for the next two. Avoiding relegation, ASV Burglengenfeld played another three good seasons in the league, culminating in a third place in 1982–83. After a fifth place in 1984 the club was relegated in 1985 after coming fifteenth, never to make return to the league until it was disbanded in 2012.

ASV made its first national cup appearance in 1978–79, going out to Viktoria Köln after a 4–1 home defeat. It returned to the competition in 1980–81, suffering another first round home loss, this time to VfB Wissen. The club's third appearance in the cup came in 1983–84, when it defeated KSV Baunatal 2–1 in the first round but than lost 3–0 in the second to SV Werder Bremen.

After an era where the club played in the Bezirksliga or the leagues below, ASV won promotion to the tier six Bezirksoberliga Oberpfalz in 2003. It was relegated again after only one season but returned to the league in 2007 to play at this level until the league was disbanded in 2012.

ASV spend the 2012–13 season back in the Bezirksliga but finished runners-up and returned to the Landeliga for the first time in almost three decades. The club entered the Landesliga Bayern-Mitte, a league different in region from the old Landesliga Mitte, for the 2013–14 season, finishing fifth in its first year there and being a promotion contender in its second season, finishing runners-up and successfully taking part in the promotion round to the Bayernliga. ASV had to enter the relegation round at the end of its inaugural Bayernliga season and, after two losses to TSV Bogen, dropped back to the Landesliga.

== Honours ==
The club's honours:

- Landesliga Bayern-Mitte
  - Runners-up: 2015
- Bezirksliga Oberpfalz
  - Champions: 1977
  - Runners-up: 1969, 1971
- Bezirksliga Oberpfalz-Süd
  - Champions: 2003, 2007
  - Runners-up: 2006, 2013

== Recent seasons ==
The recent season-by-season performance of the club:

Season	Division	Tier	Position
2003–04	Bezirksoberliga Oberpfalz	VI	15th↓
2004–05	Bezirksliga Oberpfalz-Süd	VII	3rd
2005–06	Bezirksliga Oberpfalz-Süd	VII	2nd
2006–07	Bezirksliga Oberpfalz-Süd	VII	1st ↑
2007–08	Bezirksoberliga Oberpfalz	VI	12th
2008–09	Bezirksoberliga Oberpfalz	VII	8th
2009–10	Bezirksoberliga Oberpfalz	VII	6th
2010–11	Bezirksoberliga Oberpfalz	VII	8th
2011–12	Bezirksoberliga Oberpfalz	VII	14th
2012–13	Bezirksliga Oberpfalz-Süd	VII	2nd ↑
2013–14	Landesliga Bayern-Mitte	VI	5th
2014–15	Landesliga Bayern-Mitte	VI	2nd ↑
2015–16	Bayernliga Nord	V	15th ↓
2016–17	Landesliga Bayern-Mitte	VI	

- With the introduction of the Regionalligas in 1994 and the 3. Liga in 2008 as the new third tier, below the 2. Bundesliga, all leagues below dropped one tier.

↑ Promoted	↓ Relegated
