= Bezirksoberliga Bayern =

- Founded: 1988
- Folded: 2012
- Country: Germany
- Level on pyramid: 7
- Promotion to: Landesliga Bayern
- Relegation to: Bezirksligas

The seven Bezirksoberligas Bayern were the third highest level of the Bavarian football league system, below the Bayernliga and the Landesliga Bayern from 1988 to 2012. They were the seventh tier of the German football league system. Until the introduction of the 3. Liga in 2008 it was the sixth tier of the league system, until the introduction of the Regionalligas in 1994 the fifth tier.

== Overview ==
The seven Bezirksoberligas were introduced in 1988 to create a highest single-division playing level for each of the seven Bezirke. Before that the Bezirksligas were located right below the Landesliga in the pyramid. They were created upon suggestion of the 1. FC Sonthofen. However, it took this club till 1998 to gain promotion to the Bezirksoberliga Schwaben.

The winners of the seven Bezirksoberligas are automatically promoted to their respective Landesliga. The second-placed teams face a series of play-off matches to determine one or two more promotion spots.

Teams relegated from the Bezirksoberliga drop into the Bezirksliga of which there are usually two, except Oberbayern where there are three.

Only one club has won a Bezirksoberliga four times, the TSV Kottern from Schwaben.

The German term "Bezirksoberliga" is best translated as "County Premier League". The Bezirke are political and administrative units similar to a county in size.

With the league reform at the end of the 2011–12 season, which includes an expansion of the number of Landesligas from three to five, the Bezirksoberligas were disbanded. Instead, the Bezirksligas took the place of the Bezirksoberligas below the Landesligas once more.

The clubs from the Bezirksoberligas joined the following leagues:

- Champions: Promotion round to the Bayernliga, winners to the Bayernliga, losers to the Landesliga.
- Teams placed 2nd to 6th: Directly qualified to the Landesliga.
- Teams placed 7th or worse: Between two and six additional Landesliga places, according to the size of the Bezirk, to be determined in a play-off round with the Bezirksliga champions. Non-qualified teams to remain at this tier.

The Bezirk of Upper Bavaria received six additional qualification spots to the Landesliga, Middle Franconia and Lower Franconia received four each, Swabia, Upper Franconia and Lower Bavaria received three, while the Upper Palatinate received only two.

== Relation of Bezirksoberligas to Landesligas ==
- Bezirksoberliga Schwaben - Landesliga Bayern-Süd
- Bezirksoberliga Oberbayern - Landesliga Bayern-Süd
- Bezirksoberliga Mittelfranken - Landesliga Bayern-Mitte
- Bezirksoberliga Oberpfalz - Landesliga Bayern-Mitte
- Bezirksoberliga Niederbayern - Landesliga Bayern-Mitte
- Bezirksoberliga Unterfranken - Landesliga Bayern-Nord
- Bezirksoberliga Oberfranken - Landesliga Bayern-Nord

== League statistics ==
The league's statistics:

=== Longest-serving clubs ===
The following clubs have spent more than half of the 24 seasons of the league's existence in it:

League	Club
Bezirksoberliga Schwaben	SpVgg Kaufbeuren (22), TSV Bobingen (16), TSV Kottern (15), TSV 1861 Nördlingen (14), FC Memmingen II (14), TSV Landsberg (13)
Bezirksoberliga Oberbayern	ASV Dachau (19), 1. FC Traunstein (16), SpVgg Feldmoching (14), TSV München-Grünwald (13)
Bezirksoberliga Niederbayern	TSV Waldkirchen (20), ETSV Landshut (17), TSV Mauth (16), SpVgg Lam (16), SC Zwiesel (15), TSV Regen (15), SpVgg Ruhmannsfelden (13), SV Hutthurm (13)
Bezirksoberliga Oberpfalz	TSV Kareth-Lappersdorf (20), Fortuna Regensburg (17), FC Tegernheim (15), 1. FC Beilngries (15), TSV Detag Wernberg (14), 1. FC Schwandorf (14)
Bezirksoberliga Mittelfranken	TSV Weißenburg (15), DJK Schwabach (15), FV Wendelstein (14), ASV Zirndorf (13), SpVgg Heßdorf (13)
Bezirksoberliga Oberfranken	ASV Gaustadt (13)
Bezirksoberliga Unterfranken	SV Erlenbach (18), TSV Pflaumheim (14)

=== League championships ===
The following clubs hold the record number of championships per league:

League	Club	Number
Bezirksoberliga Schwaben	TSV Kottern	4
Bezirksoberliga Oberbayern	TSV Großhadern, SC Eintracht Freising	2
Bezirksoberliga Niederbayern	SpVgg Hankofen-Hailing, SpVgg GW Deggendorf	3
Bezirksoberliga Oberpfalz	FC Amberg	3
Bezirksoberliga Mittelfranken	Jahn Forchheim, TSV Neustadt/Aisch, FV Wendelstein, 1. SC Feucht	2
Bezirksoberliga Oberfranken	1. FC Trogen, SV Memmelsdorf, DVV Coburg, ATS Kulmbach	2
Bezirksoberliga Unterfranken	SV Erlenbach	3
