= List of clubs in the Landesliga Bayern-Nord =

This is a List of clubs in the Landesliga Bayern-Nord, including all clubs and their final placings from the first season in 1963–64 to 2010–11. The league, commonly referred to as the Landesliga Nord, is the second-highest football league in the state of Bavaria (German: Bayern) and the Bavarian football league system. It is one of three Landesligas in Bavarian football, the sixth tier of the German football league system. Until the introduction of the 3. Liga in 2008 it was the fifth tier.

== Overview ==
Since the formation of the league in 1963, it has served as the tier below the Bayernliga, together with the central and the southern division of the Landesliga. Originally a tier-four league, it was demoted to tier-five status in 1994, when the Regionalligas were introduced. In 2008, it was then demoted to tier-six status, when the 3. Liga was established.

Originally, the Bezirksligas were the feeder leagues to the Landesliga Süd, of which there were, for the most part, four, two each in Upper and Lower Franconia. From 1988, Bezirksoberligas served as feeder leagues instead, having been established as a new tier between the Landesligas and the Bezirksligas. The two leagues below the Landesliga Nord have since been the Bezirksoberliga Unterfranken and the Bezirksoberliga Oberfranken.

== Clubs and their placings ==
The complete list of clubs and placings in the league since the introduction of the league in 1963:

=== 1963–1988 ===
The first 25 seasons from 1963 to 1988:

Club	S	64	65	66	67	68	69	70	71	72	73	74	75	76	77	78	79	80	81	82	83	84	85	86	87	88
VfL Frohnlach	11																	1	B	B	B	B	B	B	B	B
SV Heidingsfeld	14																14	13	8	8	2	2	1	B	B	B
FC Schweinfurt 05	5	RL	RL	RL	RL	RL	RL	RL	RL	RL	RL	RL	2B	2B	B	B	B	B	B	B	B	1	B	1	B	B
FC Kronach	21					3	6	7	1	B	8	14	13	10	10	15							4	4	1	B
FC Bayern Hof ^{9}	13	RL	RL	RL	RL	RL	RL	RL	RL	RL	RL	RL	2B	2B	2B	2B	B	B	3	4	1	B	3	6	3	1
VfB Helmbrechts ^{4}	16	B	B	B	B	B	B	B	B	4	3	2	4	6	3	8	1	B	B	B	B	3	2	2	2	2
SC Weismain	12																							7	7	3
FC Bayern Alzenau ^{3}	9																					14	10	5	6	4
DJK Schweinfurt	14																					19				5
SV Memmelsdorf	16																									6
VfB Coburg ^{7}	15				1	B	B	B	B	3	1	B	B	B	B	B	7	5	2	1	B	B	6	8	5	7
TSV Trebgast	13												2	3	1	B	B	B	B	3	7	8	8	3	8	8
FT Schweinfurt	31		7	7	8	17														2	4	6	9	11	11	9
Wacker Marktredwitz	21	16				14	5	2	10	11	17				17					7	5	10	11	14		10
1. FC Sand	28																			5	14	16		10	12	11
FC Ochsenfurt	2																									12
Kickers Würzburg	23	B	B	B	B	B	B	B	B	B	B	B	B	B	B	2B	B	B	B	B	B	4	7	9	4	13
TSV Schlüsselfeld	1																									14
TV Helmstadt	4																								9	15
FC Lichtenfels	16	B	B	B	B	B	B	B	B	B	B	3	8	5	13	18					11	11	13	12	10	16
BSC Saas Bayreuth	6								5	2	16							15							13	17
ASV Rimpar	6																						12	15	14	
1. FC Bamberg ^{8}	24	B	B	B	B	B	3	4	7	12	10	6	1	B	12	7	8	6	1	B	B	B	B	B	15	
FC Zeil	2																				16				16	
TV Ebern	1																								17	
FC Münchberg	15			3	6	1	B	9	3	6	5	17				10	6	17			6	15		13	18	
TSV Amorbach	1																							16		
ATS Kulmbach	19	9	5	10	14	4	4	5	11	7	2	1	B	B	B	B	B	B	B	B	9	7	5	17		
SpVgg Wiesau	4						9	8	15															18		
SV Hallstadt	13													4	4	9	3	12	11	13	8	12	14			
1. FC Haßfurt	21	B	B	B	B	B	B	B	B	B	11	5	5	1	B	B	B	B	B	6	3	9	15			
1. FC Bayreuth ^{10}	16	3	1	B	2	2	1	B	2	1	B	B	B	7	9	5	4	4	7	15		5	16			
TG Höchberg	24																						17			
BSV 98 Bayreuth ^{10}	11											8	9	2	2	3	5	8	9	12	17		18			
ASV Gaustadt	9	12	18					14	16											9	12	13	19			
TSV Hirschaid	7														7	1	B	3	5	16		17				
SV Erlenbach	11															11	2	2	6	14	10	18				
FC Reichenbach	3																		15		13	20				
SC Reichmannsdorf	4															16			4	10	15					
TSV Unterpleichfeld	1																				18					
SpVgg Bayreuth II ^{2}	5																		13	11						
VfR Goldbach	2																		10	17						
SpVgg Niedernberg	1																			18						
TuS Frammersbach	5																		12	19						
FV Würzburg 04 ^{1}	16	1	B	B	3	9	2	1	B	B	B	B	B	B	2B	2B	2B	2B	B							
ASV Sassanfahrt	3																12	14	14							
VfR 07 Schweinfurt	3																13	10	16							
VfL Neustadt	15	B	B	2	7	13	10	10	14		4	13	6	8	5	2	10	9	17							
SV Wonfurt	2																	11	18							
FC Kirchheim	6												7	9	8	12	9	16								
SpVgg Oberkotzau	2																11	18								
FK Selb	8									13	12	11	12	14	15	13	15									
SV Neuses	6											15	11	13	14	6	16									
FC Gerolzhofen	8											10	10	11	6	4	17									
1. FC Bad Brückenau	2															14	18									
TSV Güntersleben	2														11	17										
SpVgg Hof ^{9}	13	5	4	1	B	5	7	11	8	14	14	16	3	15	16											
TSV Donndorf	13		2	11	9	11	11	13	4	5	9	9	14	12	18											
SV Hofheim	1													16												
TSV Kulmbach	1													17												
FC Wipfeld	3										13	7	16													
Sylvia Ebersdorf	8	2	3	9	5	10	12	15					17													
SG Burgsinn	2											12	18													
SC Kreuzwertheim ^{11}	2										7	4														
TSV Karlburg	4									9	6	18														
SC Altenplos	1										15															
1. FC Schwarzenbach	5				16			6	12	10	18															
TSV Mainaschaff ^{12}	6			12	15		14	3	6	8																
1. FC Michelau	8	7	6	5	10	12	16		9	15																
1. FC Eibelstadt	1									16																
TSV Staffelstein	6			4	4	6	13	18		17																
Bayern Kitzingen	9	11	13	6	18				13	18																
SV Stockstadt	1								17																	
1. FC Bad Kissingen	5				13	7	8	12	18																	
Post-SV Würzburg	2	17						16																		
SV Großwallstadt ^{13}	3	8	10					17																		
VfB Rehau	6	14	8	8	11	8	15																			
TBV Wildenheid	1						17																			
SV Veitshöchheim	2			17			18																			
1. FC Burgkunstadt	2				12	15																				
SV Rieneck	1					16																				
ETSV Würzburg	1					18																				
TSV Gochsheim	4	13	9	13	17																					
VfB Bayreuth ^{10}	3	6	11	14																						
SV Miltenberg	2		12	15																						
TSV Lohr	2	15		16																						
FC Schweinfurt 05 II	2	10	14																							
VfB Arzberg	2	4	15																							
ETSV Bamberg	1		17																							
Frankonia Mechenhard	1	18																								

=== 1988–2012 ===
The last 24 seasons from 1988 to 2012:

Club	S	89	90	91	92	93	94	95	96	97	98	99	00	01	02	03	04	05	06	07	08	09	10	11	12
FC Bayern Alzenau ^{3}	9	5	8	8	12	H	H	H	H	H	H	H	H	H	H	H	H	H	H	H	H	H	R	H	R
SpVgg Bayern Hof ^{9}	13	B	B	3	3	2	1	B	B	B	B	B	B	B	B	B	B	2	1	B	B	B	B	B	B
TSV Großbardorf	7							16			5	3	8	2	3	2	B	B	B	B	B	R	B	B	B
Würzburger FV 04 ^{1}	16				11	6	10	6	3	2	2	1	B	B	B	1	B	1	B	B	B	B	1	B	B
FC Schweinfurt 05	5	B	B	2B	B	B	B	B	B	B	B	R	R	R	2B	R	R	B	7	1	B	B	2	B	B
VfL Frohnlach	11	B	B	2	1	B	3	B	B	B	B	B	3	3	2	3	1	B	B	B	1	B	B	1	B
Kickers Würzburg	23	4	1	B	4	11	15	9	7	1	B	9	5	8	17				6	6	2	B	5	5	1
TSV Aubstadt	11									13	14	17		10	14	14	16					9	15	13	2
SpVgg Selbitz	7																		13	4	6	13	12	2	3
SpVgg Bayreuth	4	B	B	B	B	B	B	B	B	B	1	B	2	1	B	B	B	B	R	B	B	B	B	B	4
SV Memmelsdorf	16	2	9	4	9	15							10	14	7	12	9	15			8	1	B	10	5
1. FC Sand	28	10	14	15	6	4	4	7	6	4	3	5	1	B	B	9	3	3	3	3	10	2	6	3	6
TSV Kleinrinderfeld	1																								7
1. FC Trogen	2																						16		8
Alemannia Haibach	16							2	2	B	17		13	4	10	6	5	6	10	2	4	3	4	6	9
TG Höchberg	24		7	14	14	5	8	13	5	11	6	13	14	12	8	7	6	9	14	8	7	8	3	9	10
TSV Neudrossenfeld	3																						7	8	11
DJK Don Bosco Bamberg	2																							7	12
FT Schweinfurt	31	12	13	13	18				8	8	13	14	7	13	16		7	8	9	5	12	10	8	4	13
ASV Hollfeld	4																					15	13	11	14
1. FC Burgkunstadt	4																							14	15
FC Gerolzhofen	8											18													16
TuS Frammersbach	5																							12	17
SV Pettstadt	2																	19							18
FVgg Bayern Kitzingen	9															18		18						15	
ASV Rimpar	6																					7	14	16	
FC Viktoria Kahl	12												12	9	9	10	4	10	5	12	11	14	10	17	
DVV Coburg ^{7}	8															8	12	7	16		13	11	9	18	
Eintracht Bamberg II ^{8}	2																					12	11		
FC Blau-Weiß Leinach	1																						17		
SV Friesen	8													16			8	12	12	10	3	5	18		
SV Mitterteich	14		6	9	15	17								11	5	5	10	5	11	7	9	4	19		
TSV Mönchröden	5																		4	14	5	6	20		
FC Strullendorf	10						7	11	10	6	7	10	17							15	15	16			
1. FC Haßfurt	21	13		11	16	16				9	9	16			4	11	11	17			16	17			
TSV Sulzfeld	7													15	12	13	13	16			14	18			
TSV Thiersheim	9									12	11	11	15		11	15	17			9	17				
SpVgg Stegaurach	6							3	1	B	B	B	B	B	13	16				13	18				
SV Aschaffenburg-Damm ^{6}	1																			11					
TSV Lengenfeld	2																		15	16					
TSV Karlburg	4																			17					
SpVgg Bayreuth II ^{2}	5																	11	8	18					
1. FC Bamberg ^{8}	24					8	17				15	8	4	6	6	4	2	4	2						
TSV Aidhausen	3																14	14	17						
SV Erlenbach	11								17							17		13	18						
SpVgg Bayern Hof II	1																15								
SC Weismain	12	8	11	5	5	7	5	1	B	R	R	R	B	5	15		18								
TSV Gerbrunn ^{5}	4											6	6	7	1	B									
TSV Scheuerfeld	1															19									
Wacker Trailsdorf	1														18										
Teutonia Obernau	8						13	4	4	3	8	15	9	17											
DJK Waldberg	7						9	10	11	5	4	2	11	18											
ATS Kulmbach	19	15			17							7	16												
DJK Schweinfurt	14	7	2	7	10	10	14	15	13	7	10	12	18												
SC Weismain II	3										12	4	19												
FC Kronach	21	B	5	6	13	9	18		12	10	16														
1. FC Lichtenfels	16				19			8	9	14	18														
FC Adler Weidhausen	4							12	15	15	19														
VfB Helmbrechts ^{4}	16	1	B	B	8	1	B	B	B	B															
FC Rodach	4						11	5	14	16															
SV Frankenwinheim	1									17															
ASV Gaustadt	9									18															
SV Heidingsfeld	14	6	3	10	2	3	2	B	16																
SC 08 Bamberg	4			1	B	B	12	14	18																
VfB Coburg ^{7}	15	16				12	16	17																	
Wacker Marktredwitz	21	3	4	12	7	13	6	18																	
TV Helmstadt	4			16		14																			
SV Hallstadt	13	14	10	17																					
TSV Trebgast	13	11	12	18																					
SG Randersacker	2	9	15																						
FC Frankonia Thulba	1		16																						
TSV Hirschaid	7		17																						
FC Ochsenfurt	2	17																							

=== Key ===
Symbol	Key
B	Bundesliga
RL 2B	Regionalliga Süd (1963–74): 2. Bundesliga (1974–present)
3L	3. Liga
R	Regionalliga Süd (1994–present)
B	Bayernliga
1	League champions
Place	League
Blank	Played at a league level below this league
H	Played in the league system of Hesse

- S = No of seasons in league (as of 2011–12)

=== Notes ===
- ^{1} In 1981, FV Würzburg 04 folded and reformed as Würzburger FV.
- ^{2} In 1982, the SpVgg Bayreuth II withdrew from the league because the club's first team was relegated to the Bayernliga.
- ^{3} In 1992, the FC Bayern Alzenau withdrew from the league and joined the Landesliga Hessen-Süd instead. In 2009, the club earned promotion to the Regionalliga.
- ^{4} In 1997, the VfB Helmbrechts withdrew from the Bayernliga to the lower amateur leagues.
- ^{5} In 2003, the TSV Gerbrunn withdrew from the Bayernliga to the lower amateur leagues.
- ^{6} In 2007, the SV Aschaffenburg-Damm withdrew from the league.
- ^{7} In 2000, VfB Coburg merged with DJK/Viktoria Coburg to form DVV Coburg. In 2011, the new club became insolvent and will be disbanded on 30 June 2012.
- ^{8} In 2006, the 1. FC Bamberg merged with TSV Eintracht Bamberg to form 1. FC Eintracht Bamberg. The club became insolvent in 2010, folded, reformed as FC Eintracht Bamberg 2010 and continued playing in the Bayernliga. The reserve team however withdrew from the Landesliga.
- ^{9} In 2005, the FC Bayern Hof merged with SpVgg Hof to form SpVgg Bayern Hof. League placings for SpVgg Hof are shown separately while placings for FC and SpVgg Bayern Hof are combined.
- ^{10} In 2003, 1. FC Bayreuth and BSV 98 Bayreuth merged to form FSV Bayreuth. BSV 98 Bayreuth itself had been formed in a merger of VfB Bayreuth and TuSpo Bayreuth in 1968.
- ^{11} In 1974, the SC Kreuzwertheim disbanded its football department.
- ^{12} In 1972, the TSV Mainaschaff withdrew from the league.
- ^{13} In 1965, the SV Großwallstadt withdrew from the league.
