= Norbert Schlegel =

German footballer and coach

Personal information
- Date of birth: March 9, 1961 (age 65)
- Place of birth: Sassanfahrt, West Germany
- Height: 1.82 m (6 ft 0 in)
- Positions: Defender; midfielder

Team information
- Current team: SV Memmelsdorf (manager)

Youth career
- ASV Sassanfahrt

Senior career*
Years	Team	Apps	(Gls)
1979–1983	1. FC Nürnberg	52	(4)
1983–1990	1. FC Saarbrücken	213	(38)
1990–1992	Hertha BSC	51	(3)
1992–1993	Greuther Fürth		
1993–1996	SpVgg Stegaurach		

Managerial career
- 1997–2000: SpVgg Stegaurach
- 2001–2002: Bayern Hof
- 2002–2004: Greuther Fürth II
- 2006–2007: SpVgg Bayreuth
- 2007: SpVgg Weiden
- 2008–2010: SV Memmelsdorf
- 2010–2013: Bayern Hof
- * Club domestic league appearances and goals

Norbert Schlegel (born March 9, 1961) is a German former footballer who became a coach.
