= FSV Bayreuth =

- Founded: 14 May 2003
- Ground: BSV-Stadion
- Capacity: 7,000
- Chairman: Jürgen Bauer
- Manager: Claudio Eismann
- League: Kreisliga Bayreuth-Kulmbach (VIII)
- 2015–16: Bezirksliga Oberfranken-Ost (VII), 1st (promoted)
Home colours	Away colours

The FSV Bayreuth is a German association football club from the city of Bayreuth, Bavaria.

The club was formed in a merger of the football departments of 1. FC Bayreuth and BSV 98 Bayreuth in May 2003. BSV was the product of an earlier merger between VfB Bayreuth and TuSpo Bayreuth.

== History ==
=== FSV Bayreuth ===
The club was formed on 14 May 2003, when the football departments of 1. FC and BSV 98 Bayreuth merged. The two original clubs still exist and as non-football clubs.

The new club started out in the tier-eight Kreisliga Bayreuth in 2003–04, where it finished in mid-table. In its second season, the club improved but it was not enough to earn promotion. The club took until its fourth season in the league win promotion by finishing first in the league. In its first season in the Bezirksliga Oberfranken-Ost, FSV finished in secure mid-field. The following year, the club took out the championship in this league and earned promotion to the Bezirksoberliga Oberfranken for 2009–10.

At the end of the 2011–12 season, the team qualified for the newly expanded Landesliga after finishing seventh in the Bezirksoberliga and defeating 1. FC Redwitz in the promotion round.

The 2012–13 season saw the club finish seventeenth in the Landesliga, requiring it to enter a play-of-round with the Bezirksliga runners-up. In the first round of these Bayreuth lost to TuS 1861 Feuchtwangen and was consequently relegated back to the Bezirksliga. In 2014 and 2015 the team finished runners-up in the Bezirksliga but on each occasion failed to win promotion. It won the league in 2016 and was promoted to the Landesliga.

=== TuSpo Bayreuth ===
TuSpo was formed on 4 December 1898 under the name of Freie Turner Bayreuth as a working-class gymnastics club. In 1910, the club changed its name to Freie Turnerschaft Bayreuth and after World War I adopted the name Turn- und Sport 1898 Bayreuth.

Like other workers' and faith-based clubs, TuSpo was outlawed by the Nazis as politically undesirable in 1933. It was re-established in 1947 after the end of the war. As a football club, it never reached above the local A-Klasse, living in the shadow of the other, more powerful football clubs in town.

In April 1967, the club members voted in favor of taking part in merger negotiations with several other Bayreuth sports clubs. Most of these turned away from the idea of a merger, but continued negotiations with VfB Bayreuth led to the formation of BSV 98 Bayreuth out of TuSpo and VfB on 14 March 1969.

=== VfB Bayreuth ===
Formed as FC St. Georgen in 1913, the club took up football just before the start of World War I and after the war, it changed its name to VfB Bayreuth. They made the disastrous decision to purchase their football field and the associated costs forced the VfB into liquidation in 1930.

Several old members formed a new VfB Bayreuth almost immediately and the new club soon became a force in regional football. It soon advanced to the tier-two Bezirksliga, where it met strong northern Bavarian clubs like FC Bayern Hof. With the events of the Second World War, it became harder for the VfB to field a team, and local war unions with other clubs had to be formed, so-called Kriegssportgemeinschaften.

The post-war area brought the greatest success to the club to date. It won the Kreisliga Oberfranken-Ost in 1952 and then, in the promotion round, finished second behind VfB Coburg, earning promotion to the tier-three Amateurliga Bayern. The league split into a northern and a southern division in 1953 and VfB became part of the Amateurliga Nordbayern. In this league, in 1953–54, it finished third, behind VfL Neustadt and 1. FC Lichtenfels. From 1954 onwards, three clubs from Bayreuth played in the league, VfB, 1. FC and a newcomer, SpVgg Bayreuth.

The club's greatest moment came in 1956 when it won its division, the year 1. FCB suffered relegation. It then went on to beat ESV Ingolstadt in three games and was crowned Bavarian champions. In the following promotion round to the tier-two 2. Oberliga Süd, the team could only win one of its four games, and SpVgg Neu-Isenburg and VfR Heilbronn were promoted instead. VfB's performances from then on fell off, finishing fourth and ninth the following years.

The 1958–59 season became something special for football in Bayreuth. SpVgg, 1. FC and VfB finished first second and third in the league. While SpVgg earned promotion, the other two clubs declined and were both relegated from the league in 1961. For VfB, it was its last visit to this level.

VfB became a member of the tier-four 2. Amateurliga Oberfranken, where it performed well enough to qualify for the new Landesliga Bayern-Nord in 1963. It played in the Landesliga until 1966 when it was relegated to the tier-five Bezirksliga Oberfranken-Ost, a league it played in as an upper-table side until 1966 when another relegation took it down to the Bezirksliga.

On 19 December 1968, the members of VfB voted in favor of the merger and the club ceased to exist shortly after, becoming part of BSV 98.

=== BSV 98 Bayreuth ===
Logo of predecessor side BSV 98 Bayreuth

The new merger club was not an instant success and it took until 1973 to earn promotion back to the Landesliga Bayern-Nord, the highest level the club would ever get to. In 1975–76, BSV 98 finished second in the Landesliga, reunited with 1. FC in a league, who had just been relegated. It repeated this result the season after, and continued to stay a top-side in the league the following years.

In 1983, after declining year by year, the team was relegated to the Bezirksliga. It made an immediate return from there but, in 1985, it was relegated for the last time from the Landesliga, alongside 1. FC.

In 1988, the Bezirksoberliga Oberfranken was formed and BSV qualified for it, as did 1. FC. The club was not an outstanding side in this league to begin with but came second in 1990. It repeated this result the year after but was on equal points with 1. FC Lichtenfels and lost a decider between the two in 1988. The team slipped into the leagues mid-field from there, until suffering relegation in 1995. As a sign of the club's decline, it did not return to this level either.

After a third place in its first Bezirksliga season, it slipped to the other end of the table the year after and was relegated to the A-Klasse in 1998, following 1. FCB there.

=== 1. FC Bayreuth ===
Of the football clubs in Bayreuth, 1. FC was the only one to reach top-level football in its history, earning promotion to the Bezirksliga Bayern in 1926. In a league with 1. FC Nürnberg and SpVgg Fürth, the club held its own, a fourth place in 1933 being its best result. The club qualified for the new Gauliga Bayern that year but was relegated from there in 1934. It returned once more to this level in 1935–36 but for only one season.

1. FC attempted to return to Bavaria's highest league, now the tier-two Landesliga Bayern, in 1946 but failed in the promotion round.

In 1949, it fared better, winning the Kreisliga Oberfranken-Ost and the promotion round and moving up to what was now the tier-three Amateurliga Bayern. In this league, the club finished second and earned the right to compete in the first edition of the German amateur football championship, where it lost 1–0 to VfL Sindelfingen in the first round.

The club continued to be a strong side in the league the following season and became part of the northern group of the Bavarian Amateurliga. In this league, the team became a struggler against relegation and finished last in 1956, dropping down to the 2nd Amateurliga. It won the title there in the eastern division in 1957 but failed to earn promotion when it only came fourth in the promotion round. Another 2nd Amateurliga title and a victory over western Oberfranken champions FC Wallenfels meant a return to the Amateurliga the following year.

Freshly promoted, the team finished second in the Amateurliga in 1959, behind SpVgg Bayreuth, the year after, it came third. in 1961, it was relegated once more, alongside local rival VfB. the club returned immediately to the Amateurliga in 1962 but missed qualification to the new single division league by two points in 1963. Instead, it had to enter the new Landesliga Bayern-Nord.

The club came third in the league in 1964 but won it the year after, returning once more to the Amateurliga. The team played as an elevator side in the following years, earning promotion to the Amateurliga in 1969 and 1972 again, while being relegated from there in 1966, 1970 and, for a last time, in 1975.

In the Landesliga, 1. FC had one more good season in 179–80, finishing fourth. After this, in 1982, the club was relegated to the Bezirksliga. It made an immediate return from there but, in 1985, it was relegated for the last time from the Landesliga, alongside BSV.

In 1988, the Bezirksoberliga Oberfranken was formed and 1. FC qualified for it, as did BSV. The club lasted for only one season there, being relegated straight away. The 1. FC now played in the Bezirksliga Oberfranken-Ost again, originally as a mid-table side. In 1993, it suffered another drop, now to the A-Klasse.

Up until the merger in 2003, neither club managed to return from local Bayreuth amateur football.

== Honours ==
The club's honours:

=== FSV ===
- Bezirksliga Oberfranken-Ost (VIII)
  - Champions: 2009, 2016
  - Runners-up: 2014, 2015
- Kreisliga Bayreuth (VIII)
  - Champions: 2007

=== 1. FCB ===
- Amateurliga Nordbayern (III)
  - Runners-up: 1951, 1959
- Landesliga Bayern-Nord (IV)
  - Champions: 1965, 1969, 1972
  - Runners-up: 1967, 1968, 1971
- 2nd Amateurliga Oberfranken-Ost (IV)
  - Champions: 1957, 1958

=== VfB ===
- Amateurliga Nordbayern (III)
  - Champions: 1956
- 2nd Amateurliga Oberfranken-Ost (IV)
  - Champions: 1952, 1963

=== BSV 98 ===
- Landesliga Bayern-Nord (IV)
  - Runners-up: 1976, 1977
- Bezirksliga Oberfranken-Ost (V)
  - Champions: 1973, 1984

== Recent seasons ==
The recent season-by-season performance of the club:

Year	Division	Tier	Position
2003–04	Kreisliga Bayreuth	VIII	8th
2004–05	Kreisliga Bayreuth	VIII	3rd
2005–06	Kreisliga Bayreuth	VIII	5th
2006–07	Kreisliga Bayreuth	VIII	1st ↑
2007–08	Bezirksliga Oberfranken-Ost	VII	9th
2008–09	Bezirksliga Oberfranken-Ost	VIII	1st ↑
2009–10	Bezirksoberliga Oberfranken	VII	4th
2010–11	Bezirksoberliga Oberfranken	VII	5th
2011–12	Bezirksoberliga Oberfranken	VII	7th ↑
2012–13	Landesliga Bayern-Nordost	VI	17th ↓
2013–14	Bezirksliga Oberfranken-Ost	VII	2nd
2014–15	Bezirksliga Oberfranken-Ost	VII	2nd
2015–16	Bezirksliga Oberfranken-Ost	VII	1st ↑
2016–17	Landesliga Bayern-Nordost	VI	

- With the introduction of the Bezirksoberligas in 1988 as the new fifth tier, below the Landesligas, all leagues below dropped one tier. With the introduction of the Regionalligas in 1994 and the 3. Liga in 2008 as the new third tier, below the 2. Bundesliga, all leagues below dropped one tier. With the establishment of the Regionalliga Bayern as the new fourth tier in Bavaria in 2012 the Bayernliga was split into a northern and a southern division, the number of Landesligas expanded from three to five and the Bezirksoberligas abolished. All leagues from the Bezirksligas onward were elevated one tier.

↑ Promoted	↓ Relegated
