= Landesliga Bayern-Nordost =

- Founded: 2012
- Country: Germany
- State: Bavaria
- Number of clubs: 18
- Level on pyramid: Level 6
- Promotion to: Bayernliga
- Relegation to: Bezirksliga
- Current champions: TSV Kornburg (2021–22)

The Landesliga Bayern-Nordost (English: State league Bavaria-Northeast) is currently the sixth tier of the German football league system in northeastern Bavaria and the third tier of the Bavarian football league system.

It is one of five Landesligas in Bavaria, the other four being the Landesliga Südwest, Landesliga Mitte, Landesliga Nordwest and Landesliga Südost. The league champion automatically qualifies for the Bayernliga, the runners-up needs to compete with the runners-up of the other four Landesligas and a number of Bayernliga teams for another promotion spot.

The league replaced the Landesliga Bayern-Nord and the Landesliga Bayern-Mitte at this level, both formed in 1963, with the former disbanded in 2012 while the latter was reduced in area of coverage. The new Landesliga Nordost covers eastern Upper Franconia, formerly part of the Landesliga Nord, and the northern parts of Upper Palatinate and Middle Franconia, formerly part of the Landesliga Mitte.

== History ==
=== Formation ===
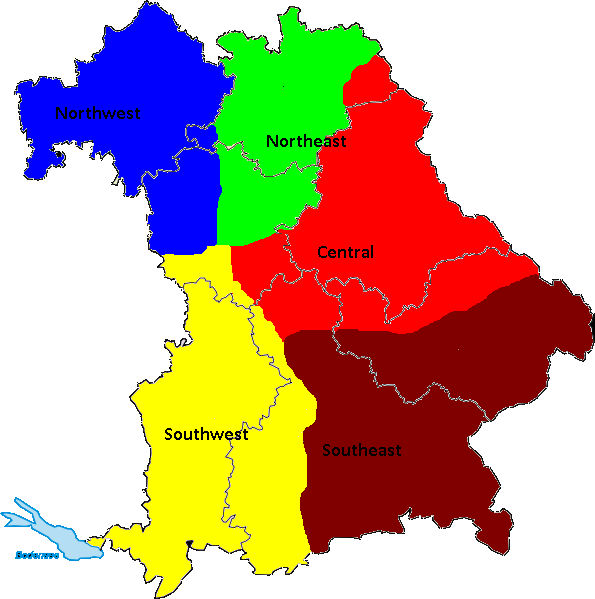
The Landesligas from 2012 onwards.

The Bavarian Football Association carried out drastic changes to the league system at the end of the 2011–12 season. With the already decided introduction of the Regionalliga Bayern from 2012–13, it also placed two Bayernligas below the new league as the new fifth tier of the German league system, splitting the previously single division league into a northern and a southern group. Below those, five Landesligas instead of the existing three were set, which were geographically divided to limit travel and increase the number of local derbies.

Clubs from three different league tiers were able to qualify for the new league. From the Landesliga level, the clubs placed ninth to 15th had the opportunity to qualify for the Bayernliga through play-offs. Those clubs who failed to qualify for the Bayernliga were grouped in the Landesliga. The Landesliga clubs placed 16th, 17th and 18th automatically went to the Landesliga. The Bezirksoberliga (BOL) champions also had the chance to qualify for the Bayernliga. Those clubs who failed went to the Landesliga, alongside the BOL teams placed second to sixth. The teams placed seventh in Upper Palatinate, seventh to twelfth in Lower Franconia and seventh to thirteens in Upper Franconia entered a play-off with the Bezirksliga champions for the remaining Landesliga spots. The league, in its inaugural season, plays with 20 clubs instead of 18, like the other four, because of a successful protest by 1. FC Burgkunstadt which saw a minor realignement of the leagues.

The league started out with 20 clubs in its inaugural season, the clubs coming from the following leagues:

- From the Landesliga Bayern-Nord (VI): TSV Neudrossenfeld, 1. FC Burgkunstadt
- From the Landesliga Bayern-Mitte (VI): FSV Erlangen-Bruck II, Dergah Spor Nürnberg, SV Buckenhofen, SV Etzentricht
- From the Bezirksoberliga Mittelfranken (VII): SG Quelle Fürth, TSV Buch, ASV Zirndorf, FSV Stadeln, ASV Vach
- From the Bezirksoberliga Oberfranken (VII): SV Friesen, FC Vorwärts Röslau, SV Mitterteich, BSC Saas Bayreuth, TSV Thiersheim, FSV Bayreuth
- From the Bezirksoberliga Oberpfalz (VII): SpVgg Weiden
- From the Bezirksliga Oberfranken-Ost (VIII): SpVgg Oberkotzau
- From the Bezirksliga Mittelfranken-Nord (VIII): ASV Pegnitz

=== Seasons ===
The opening game of the new league took place on 17 July 2012 when SpVgg Oberkotzau hosted TSV Thiersheim in a 0-0 draw. At the end of the 2012–13 season, league champions SpVgg SV Weiden were directly promoted while runners-up SV Friesen failed to earn promotion via the promotion round. The league champions SpVgg SV Weiden had an outstanding season, winning the league by 30 points, losing only one game all season, and earning 103 points out of 36 games. At the other end of the table, FSV Erlangen-Bruck II, TSV Thiersheim and ASV Zirndorf were directly relegated, while FSV Bayreuth, ASV Vach and 1. FC Burgkunstadt had to enter the promotion/relegation round with the Bezirksliga runners-up. Both ASV Vach and 1. FC Burgkunstadt managed to hold the league while FSV Bayreuth was relegated after losing to TuS Feuchtwangen. For the 2013–14 season two clubs were promoted to the league, TSV Kirchenlaibach-Speichersdorf and ASV Veitsbronn-Siegelsdorf. Apart from these two sides the league also received 1. FC Strullendorf and SV Pettstadt who moved to the Nordost division from the Nordwest after the 2012–13 season while, in turn, SV Etzenricht and SV Mitterteich were moved to the Mitte division.

The 2019–20 season was interrupted by the coronavirus disease pandemic in Germany that began in March 2020. It was later suspended until 31 August, forcing a cancellation of the 2020–21 season as the BFV approved a resumption of the preceding one, which was curtailed in May 2021.

== Modus ==
The league is played in a home-and-away format with the league champion being directly promoted to the Bayernliga. The runners-up enters a promotion round with the other four Landesliga runners-up and the Bayernliga teams placed just above the direct relegation ranks, 15th and 16th in the south and 15th in the north, for additional spots in this league. The bottom three teams from the Landesliga are directly relegated to the Bezirksligas. The teams placed 15th, 16th and 17th have to play-off with the Bezirksliga runners-up for their place in the Landesliga.

== Top-three of the Landesliga ==
The following teams have finished in the top-three in the league:

Season	Champions	Runners-up	Third
2012–13	SpVgg SV Weiden	SV Friesen	SV Etzenricht
2013–14	TSV Neudrossenfeld	FSV Stadeln	TSV Buch
2014–15	1. SC Feucht	SpVgg Selbitz	TSV Buch
2015–16	ASV Neumarkt	TSV Kornburg	SG Quelle Fürth
2016–17	TSV Kornburg	**FSV Erlangen-Bruck**	SG Quelle Fürth
2017–18	ATSV Erlangen	TSV Nürnberg-Buch	1. SC Feucht
2018–19	FC Eintracht Bamberg	1. SC Feucht	TSV Neudrossenfeld
2019–21	1. SC Feucht	SC 04 Schwabach	TSV Buch
2022–23	TSV Kornburg	TSV Neudrossenfeld	SC 04 Schwabach

- Promoted teams in **bold**.
- The 2019–20 season was suspended and later extended to 2021, when it was curtailed and the top three were ranked on a points per game basis.

== League placings ==
The complete list of clubs and placings in the league since its inception in 2012:

Club	13	14	15	16	17	18	19	20	21	22	23
SV Seligenporten	**R**	**R**	**R**	**B**	**R**	**R**	**B**	**B**	**B**	**B**	x
ATSV Erlangen					5	**1**	**B**	**B**	**B**	**B**	**B**
FC Eintracht Bamberg	**R**	**R**	**R**	**B**	17^{#}		**1**	**B**	**B**	**B**	**B**
1. SC Feucht	5^{+}	14^{+}	**1**	**B**	**B**	3	2	1	**1**	**B**	**B**
ASV Neumarkt	**B**	**B**	3^{+}	**1**	**B**	**B**	**B**	1^{+}	**1**^{+}	**B**	**B**
SpVgg SV Weiden	**1**	**B**	**B**	**B**	**B**	**B**	3^{+}	2^{+}	2^{+}	**1**^{+}	**B**
TSV Kornburg				2	**1**	**B**	11	14	8	**1**	**B**
TSV Neudrossenfeld	6	**1**	**B**	5	8	4	3	4	5	2	x
SC 04 Schwabach	17^{+}				9	7	4	3	2	3	x
1. FC Lichtenfels					8^{#}	10	9	5^{#}	7^{#}	3^{#}	x^{#}
1. FC Herzogenaurach							5	15	16	4	x
FC Coburg				12^{#}	15^{#}		15	17^{#}	17^{#}	5^{#}	x^{#}
TSV Nürnberg-Buch	12	3	3	6	4	2	13	2	3	5	x
SpVgg Jahn Forchheim	**B**	**B**	**B**	**B**	2^{#}	**B**	**B**	7	6	6	x
TSV 1860 Weißenburg										7	x^{†}
FSV Stadeln	14	2	8	14				6	4	8	x
FC Vorwärts Röslau	11	8	4	11	14		10	13	14	9	x
SG Quelle Fürth	4	4	7	3	3	5	7	10	12	10	x
FSV Erlangen-Bruck	**B**	**B**	**B**	10	2	**B**	**B**	8	10	11	x
SV Friesen	2	6	6	18		11	12	8^{#}	3^{#}	11^{#}	x^{#}
Kickers Selb								5	7	12	x
SV Memmelsdorf	**B**	**B**	**B**	10^{#}	5^{#}	6	8	6^{#}	4^{#}	12^{#}	x
SV Mitterteich	13	6^{+}	8^{+}	13^{+}	13	9	6	11	9	13	x
SC Großschwarzenlohe							14	16	15	14	x
FC Eintracht Münchberg										15	x
SV Schwaig								12	13	16	
Türkspor Nürnberg										17	
ASV Vach	16	10	9	4	6	2^{#}	**B**	9	11	18	
BSC Woffenbach								11^{+}	16^{+}	19	
VfL Frohnlach	**R**	**B**	**B**	**B**	**B**	14		15^{#}	18^{#}		
TuS Feuchtwangen				16^{†}		6^{#}	14^{#}	17	17		
Baiersdorfer SV			11^{#}	16	7	13	16	18	18		
SpVgg Selbitz	**B**	**B**	2	7	10	8	17				
TSV Sonnefeld						12	18				
ASV Veitsbronn		9	5	12	11	15					
FSV Bayreuth	17				12	16					
SpVgg Bayreuth II					15	17					
SpVgg Erlangen						18					
ASV Pegnitz	7	11	10	8	16						
Dergahspor Nürnberg	5	12	12	9	17						
SSV Kasendorf			11	13	18						
SV Poppenreuth				15							
VfL Frohnlach II			15	17^{#}							
SV Seligenporten II	15^{+}		13	17							
BSC Saas Bayreuth	8	7	14								x
TSV Kirchenlaibach		5	16								
SV Pettstadt	2^{#}	13	16^{#}								
1. FC Redwitz			17								
ASV Hollfeld	**B**	**B**	18								
SV Buckenhofen	9	14									x
1. FC Burgkunstadt	15	15									
SpVgg Oberkotzau	10	16									
1. FC Trogen	**B**	17									
1. FC Strullendorf	12^{#}	18									
ASV Zirndorf	18										
TSV Thiersheim	19										
FSV Erlangen-Bruck II	20										
SV Unterreichenbach											x

- Placings for 2020 were based on the table at the point of suspension during the coronavirus pandemic. Final placings were after the curtailment of the resumed 2019–20 season in 2021.

=== Key ===
Symbol	Key
**R**	Regionalliga Bayern
**B**	Bayernliga
**1**	League champions
Place	League
Place^{#}	Played in the Northwest division that season.
Place^{+}	Played in the Central division that season.
Place^{†}	Played in the Southwest division that season.
Blank	Played at a league level below this league
