= ATS Kulmbach =

German football club

- Full name: Allgemeiner Turn- und Sportverein Kulmbach 1861 e.V.
- Founded: 23 March 1861
- Ground: ATS-Stadion
- Chairman: Heidesuse Wagner
- Manager: Florian Ascherl
- League: Bezirksliga Oberfranken-Ost (VII)
- 2017–18: 5th
Home colours	Away colours

The ATS Kulmbach is a German association football club from the city of Kulmbach, Bavaria.

ATS, in its better days, played in the third division and reached the first round of the German Cup in 1975–76. The club has declined since then, to the point that its first team plays in tier eleven, the lowest level in its region.

== History ==
The club was formed as a gymnastics club in 1861, under the name of Turnverein 1861. It took TV until 1911, to form a football department. In 1931, the TV merged with local side Turnerbund Kulmbach to form Kulmbacher Turnerschaft.

After the end of the Second World War, on 3 March 1946, the ATS Kulmbach was formed out of this club.

ATS first made an appearance on the Bavarian football scene when they won the local Oberfranken championship in 1948 and took part in the promotion round to the Landesliga Bayern (II), where it came last, without a win. Kulmbach made another attempt at Landesliga promotion the year after but was equally as unsuccessful.

The club finally succeeded in 1951 in earning promotion to Bavaria's highest league, which was now the tier-three Amateurliga Bayern.

Kulmbach finished its first Bayernliga season in 13th place, three points away from a relegation rank. The club dramatically improved the following season, taking out the league title thanks to an unbeaten run at home. The team then took part in the promotion round to the tier-two 2nd Oberliga Süd but finished last out of six teams and FC Hanau 93 and Bavarian runners-up FC Wacker München earned promotion instead.

The Bavarian league was split into a northern and a southern division from 1953 to 1963 and ATS was grouped in the northern league, where it finished fourth in 1953–54. The club remained a mid-table side until 1957–58, when a 14th place meant relegation to what was now the 2nd Amateurliga Oberfranken (IV).

ATS took until 1960 to recover from this, when it won the eastern division of the Oberfranken league and beat western champions ASV Gaustadt to earn promotion back to the third division.

The club achieved an impressive third place in its first year back in the Amateurliga Bayern but then fell back into the mid-table regions again. In 1963, with the introduction of the Fußball-Bundesliga, the Amateurliga in Bavaria reverted to a single-division format again and ATS, finishing tenth, missed the qualifying requirements clearly.

The club now became part of the new tier-four Landesliga Bayern-Nord, where the club spent a number of average seasons, escaping further relegation in 1966–67 very narrowly. From there, Kulmbach improved, finishing in the top-five for the next three seasons. In 1971 and 1972, the club declined somewhat but a second place in 1972–73 showed, the club was improving. The year after, it won the league and returned to the Amateurliga.

Kulmbach performed well at this level, improving every season from 1974 to 1977, culminating in a runners-up finish in 1977. The club earned the right to take part in the German amateur football championship, where it bowed out in the semi-finals to the reserve team of Fortuna Düsseldorf. It also took part in the DFB-Pokal 1975–76, where it lost to Sportfreunde Siegen in the first round. ATS continued to enjoy good performances in the Amateurliga, finishing sixth, fifth and fifth. From 1980 onwards, the performance of the club declined and in 1982 it was relegated once more from what was now the Amateur Oberliga Bayern, a league it would not be able to return to.

The club experienced three good Landesliga seasons but then, in 1986, it was relegated again more, to the Bezirksliga. It made a return for one season from this league but then became part of the new Bezirksoberliga Oberfranken. In 1991, it earned promotion for one season from this league again but then did not return to this level until 1998, spending its time in the Bezirksoberliga.

For two seasons, ATS played in the Landesliga once more but, after suffering relegation once again in 2000, the club was unable to return to this level. In 2004, after a number of good years in the Bezirksoberliga, the club had to withdraw from the league.

The club's development after that remained sketchy, resurfacing in the A-Klasse Bayreuth/Kulmbach 3 (X) in 2005–06, where it took out the title. After a good result in the Kreisklasse Bayreuth 2 (IX) in 2006–07, it disappeared again, to once more return to the A-Klasse in 2008. ATS managed to reenter a football team into competition in the 2008–09 season after it was unable to do so in 2007–08.

The club's name was at times mentioned as one of the foundations of a possible FC Oberfranken, a merger of local Oberfranken powerhouses like ATS, SpVgg Bayern Hof, 1. FC Lichtenfels and FC Kronach. The goal, to bring professional football back to the region, was tried and failed by the SC Weismain and its main sponsor, Alois Dechant, in the past.

Having won the 2008–09 championship in the A-Klasse Bayreuth/Kulmbach 4 (XI), ATS Kulmbach was promoted to the Kreisklasse Bayreuth-Kulmbach 5, where it plays until 2013. The club showed a strong performance in this league in 2012–13, remaining unbeaten in the league all season and winning 32 of 34 games to earn promotion to the Kreisliga.

Another promotion followed in 2014, now back to the Bezirksliga after winning the championship in the Kreisliga Bayreuth-Kulmbach.

== Honours ==
The club's honours:

=== League ===
- Amateurliga Bayern (III)
  - Champions: 1953
- Landesliga Bayern-Nord (IV)
  - Champions: 1974
  - Runners-up: 1973
- Oberfranken championship (III–IV)
  - Champions: 1948, 1960
- 2nd Amateurliga Oberfranken Ost (IV)
  - Champions: 1949, 1951
- Bezirksoberliga Oberfranken (V–VI)
  - Champions: (2) 1991, 1998
- Kreisliga Bayreuth-Kulmbach (VIII)
  - Champions: 2014
- Kreisklasse Bayreuth-Kulmbach 5 (IX)
  - Champions: 2013
- A-Klasse Bayreuth/Kulmbach 3 (X)
  - Champions: 2006
- A-Klasse Bayreuth/Kulmbach 4 (XI)
  - Champions: 2009

== Recent seasons ==
The recent season-by-season performance of the club:

Season	Division	Tier	Position
1999–2000	Landesliga Bayern-Nord	V	16th ↓
2000–01	Bezirksoberliga Oberfranken	VI	8th
2001–02	Bezirksoberliga Oberfranken	VI	8th
2002–03	Bezirksoberliga Oberfranken	VI	4th
2003–04	Bezirksoberliga Oberfranken	VI	4th
2004–05	did not compete (Note: No record of ATS competing in league football was found.)		
2005–06	A-Klasse Bayreuth/Kulmbach 3	X	1st ↑
2006–07	Kreisklasse Bayreuth 2	IX	4th
2007–08	did not compete		
2008–09	A-Klasse Bayreuth/Kulmbach 4	XI	1st ↑
2009–10	Kreisklasse Bayreuth-Kulmbach 5	X	4th
2010–11	Kreisklasse Bayreuth-Kulmbach 5	X	9th
2011–12	Kreisklasse Bayreuth-Kulmbach 5	X	2nd
2012–13	Kreisklasse Bayreuth-Kulmbach 5	IX	1st ↑
2013–14	Kreisliga Bayreuth-Kulmbach	VIII	1st ↑
2014–15	Bezirksliga Oberfranken-Ost	VII	5th
2015–16	Bezirksliga Oberfranken-Ost	VII	3rd
2016–17	Bezirksliga Oberfranken-Ost	VII	7th
2017–18	Bezirksliga Oberfranken-Ost	VII	5th

↑ Promoted	↓ Relegated

- With the introduction of the Bezirksoberligas in 1988 as the new fifth tier, below the Landesligas, all leagues below dropped one tier. With the introduction of the Regionalligas in 1994 and the 3. Liga in 2008 as the new third tier, below the 2. Bundesliga, all leagues below dropped one tier. With the establishment of the Regionalliga Bayern as the new fourth tier in Bavaria in 2012 the Bayernliga was split into a northern and a southern division, the number of Landesligas expanded from three to five and the Bezirksoberligas abolished. All leagues from the Bezirksligas onwards were elevated one tier.
