= Maximilian Weiß =

German footballer

Personal information
- Date of birth: 22 June 1998 (age 28)
- Place of birth: Germany
- Height: 1.78 m (5 ft 10 in)
- Position: Midfielder

Team information
- Current team: Bayern Hof
- Number: 8

Youth career
- –2013: TSV Großbardorf
- 2013–2017: Carl Zeiss Jena

Senior career*
Years	Team	Apps	(Gls)
2017–2020	Carl Zeiss Jena II	45	(13)
2017–2020	Carl Zeiss Jena	7	(0)
2018	→ ZFC Meuselwitz (loan)	15	(2)
2020–2022	TSV Großbardorf	27	(4)
2022–	Bayern Hof	49	(9)
- * Club domestic league appearances and goals as of 19:21, 19 October 2023 (UTC)

Maximilian Weiß (born 22 June 1998) is a German footballer who plays as a midfielder for Bayern Hof.
