= 2013–14 Bayernliga =

Bayernliga
- Season: 2013–14
- Champions: Nord: SpVgg Bayreuth; Süd: BC Aichach
- Promoted: SpVgg Bayreuth; VfR Garching
- Relegated: Nord: SpVgg Selbitz, ASV Neumarkt, ASV Hollfeld; Süd: BC Aichach, Wacker Burghausen II, FC Affing, FC Ismaning
- Matches: 612 (306 in Bayernliga Nord & 306 in Bayernliga Süd)
- Top goalscorer: Nord: Christoph Hegenbart, Alexander Mantlik (18 goals); Süd: Florian Schrepel (22 goals)
- Total attendance: Nord: 107,178; Süd: 66,329
- Average attendance: Nord: 351; Süd: 220

The 2013–14 season of the Bayernliga, the second highest association football league in Bavaria, was the sixth season of the league at tier five (V) of the German football league system and the 69th season overall since establishment of the league in 1945. The regular season started on 19 July 2013 and finished on 24 May 2014, followed by relegation play-off games. The league season was interrupted by a winter break, which lasted from late November 2013 to the early March 2014.

The league, operating in two regional divisions, north and south, was won by SpVgg Bayreuth (North) and BC Aichach (South). It was the eighth league title for SpVgg Bayreuth while BC Aichach won the league for the first time. Aichach did not take up its right for promotion, however, instead withdrawing from the Bayernliga to the Kreisliga for financial reasons.

== Modus ==
Each division of the Bayernliga consisted of 18 clubs who would play each other in a home-and-away format. No league games would be played between clubs from different divisions during the regular season. The champions of each division were directly promoted to the Regionalliga, subject to fulfilling the licensing regulations of the later. No Bayernliga championship game was played between the two league winners. The runners-up of each league take part in promotion round with the 16th and 15th placed clubs in the Regionalliga. Should the runners-up not receive approval for a Regionalliga licence this playoff spot is passed down to the highest placed club with a licence approval. The four clubs play for one more spot in the Regionalliga in 2014–15 unless the Regionalliga champions, FC Bayern Munich II win promotion to the 3. Liga, in which case two spots in the league become available.

The bottom two teams in each division are directly relegated while the 15th and 16th as well as the 14th placed team with the lesser points take part in the relegation playoffs with the Landesliga runners-up. However, this modus was affected by the voluntary Withdrew of BC Aichach and Wacker Burghausen II from the southern division, where both teams thereby filled the two direct relegation spots and no other team was directly relegated.

== 2013–14 Standings ==
=== Bayernliga Nord ===
The division featured four new clubs with SpVgg SV Weiden and SV Erlenbach having been promoted from the Landesliga while SC Eltersdorf and VfL Frohnlach had been relegated from the Regionalliga. Additionally, SSV Jahn Regensburg II had been transferred from the southern division to the northern.

Pos	Team	Pld	W	D	L	GF	GA	GD	Pts	Promotion, qualification or relegation
1	SpVgg Bayreuth (Note: SpVgg Bayreuth, TSV Aubstadt, and FC Amberg were the only teams from the northern division to have been granted a Regionalliga license.) (C, P)	34	26	3	5	69	27	+42	81	Promotion to Regionalliga Bayern
2	TSV Aubstadt	34	20	5	9	60	30	+30	65	Qualification to promotion playoffs
3	SpVgg Jahn Forchheim (Note: SpVgg Jahn Forchheim was declined a Regionalliga licence.)	34	18	9	7	62	39	+23	63	
4	FC Amberg	34	19	3	12	57	44	+13	60	
5	SpVgg SV Weiden	34	17	7	10	63	39	+24	58	
6	TSV Großbardorf	34	17	3	14	64	53	+11	54	
7	Jahn Regensburg II	34	14	11	9	65	41	+24	53	
8	SC Eltersdorf	34	14	11	9	59	48	+11	53	
9	SV Erlenbach	34	13	12	9	43	33	+10	51	
10	Würzburger FV	34	13	6	15	41	51	−10	45	
11	VfL Frohnlach	34	12	7	15	52	53	−1	43	
12	DJK Ammerthal	34	11	9	14	44	55	−11	42	
13	SV Memmelsdorf	34	10	9	15	43	58	−15	39	
14	FSV Erlangen-Bruck	34	11	4	19	39	52	−13	37	
15	SpVgg Selbitz (R)	34	9	8	17	39	72	−33	35	Qualification to relegation playoffs
16	Alemannia Haibach	34	9	8	17	41	54	−13	35	Qualification to relegation playoffs
17	ASV Neumarkt (R)	34	7	7	20	37	67	−30	28	Relegation to Landesliga Bayern
18	ASV Hollfeld (R)	34	2	6	26	22	84	−62	12	Relegation to Landesliga Bayern

Source: Weltfussball.de
Rules for classification: 1st points; 2nd head-to-head results; 3rd goal difference; 4th number of goals scored; 5th wins; 6th goals scored away from home; 7th drawing of lots
(C) Champions; (P) Promoted; (R) Relegated

=== Bayernliga Süd ===
The division featured six new clubs with TSV Bogen, SV Pullach, SV Raisting, VfR Garching and FC Pipinsried having been promoted from the Landesliga while FC Ismaning had been relegated from the Regionalliga.

Pos	Team	Pld	W	D	L	GF	GA	GD	Pts	Promotion, qualification or relegation
1	BC Aichach (Note: BC Aichach and Wacker Burghausen II withdrew from competition at the end of season.) (C)	34	22	5	7	73	51	+22	71	Withdrew from competition at end of season
2	VfR Garching (Note: VfR Garching and FC Pipinsried were the only teams from the southern division to have been granted a Regionalliga license.) (P)	34	20	6	8	67	31	+36	66	Promotion to Regionalliga Bayern
3	FC Pipinsried	34	19	7	8	67	34	+33	64	Qualification to promotion playoffs
4	VfB Eichstätt	34	18	8	8	50	34	+16	62	
5	SV Pullach	34	16	11	7	60	35	+25	59	
6	TSV Bogen	34	14	6	14	62	63	−1	48	
7	SpVgg Hankofen-Hailing	34	14	6	14	46	58	−12	48	
8	TSV Schwabmünchen	34	12	9	13	49	50	−1	45	
9	SpVgg Unterhaching II	34	13	6	15	56	68	−12	45	
10	FC Unterföhring	34	11	10	13	53	43	+10	43	
11	SV Raisting	34	11	9	14	42	52	−10	42	
12	1. FC Sonthofen	34	10	11	13	49	51	−2	41	
13	SB/DJK Rosenheim	34	11	8	15	51	65	−14	41	
14	SpVgg Landshut	34	10	8	16	42	56	−14	38	
15	Wacker Burghausen II	34	8	12	14	53	60	−7	36	Withdrew from competition at end of season
16	BCF Wolfratshausen	34	10	6	18	51	67	−16	36	Qualification to relegation playoffs
17	FC Affing (R)	34	7	9	18	45	78	−33	30	Qualification to relegation playoffs
18	FC Ismaning (R)	34	6	11	17	39	59	−20	29	Qualification to relegation playoffs

Source: Weltfussball.de
Rules for classification: 1st points; 2nd head-to-head results; 3rd goal difference; 4th number of goals scored; 5th wins; 6th goals scored away from home; 7th drawing of lots
(C) Champions; (P) Promoted; (R) Relegated

=== Top goalscorers ===
The top goal scorers for the season:

==== Nord ====
Rank	Player	Club	Goals
1	(Germany) Christoph Hegenbart	SpVgg SV Weiden	18
1	(Germany) Alexander Mantlik	TSV Großbardorf	18
3	(Germany) Ralph Egeter	SpVgg SV Weiden	17

==== Süd ====
Rank	Player	Club	Goals
1	(Germany) Florian Schrepel	TSV Bogen	22
2	(Germany) Michael Holzhammer	FC Pipinsried	19
2	(Germany) Dennis Niebauer	VfR Garching	19

== Promotion play-offs ==
Promotion/relegation play-offs were held at the end of the season for both the Regionalliga above and the Bayernliga:

=== To the Regionalliga ===
==== First round ====
The 15th and 16th placed Regionalliga teams play the runners-up of the northern division and the third placed team in the south. Both Bayernliga teams failed to earn promotion while 1. FC Schweinfurt 05 retained its league place and TSV 1860 Rosenheim was relegated:

First leg

27 May 2014	FC Pipinsried	2−2	TSV 1860 Rosenheim
18:30	Schön 4'; Fischer 60'		Majdancevic 65'; Potenza 90+4'

27 May 2014	TSV Aubstadt	2−3	1. FC Schweinfurt 05
18:30	Leicht 50'; Köttler 76'		Jäckel 25'; Müller 35'; Häcker 69'

Second leg

30 May 2014	TSV 1860 Rosenheim	1−0	FC Pipinsried
18:30	Köhler 50'

Rosenheim won 3−2 on aggregate.

30 May 2014	1. FC Schweinfurt 05	4−1	TSV Aubstadt
19:00	Jäckel 21'; Krautschneider 27', 63'; Fery 85'		Grader 51'

Schweinfurt won 7−3 on aggregate.

==== Second round ====
The winners of the first round play each other for the one available spot in the Regionalliga:

First leg

3 June 2014	TSV 1860 Rosenheim	0−1	1. FC Schweinfurt 05
19:00			Krautschneider 76'

Second leg

6 June 2014	1. FC Schweinfurt 05	5–1	TSV 1860 Rosenheim
19:00	Müller 23', 46'; Krautschneider 30', 49'; Häcker 90'		Lenz 89'

Schweinfurt won 6–1 on aggregate.

=== To the Bayernliga ===
The second placed teams of each of the five Landesliga division, together with the worst 14th placed team and the 15th and 16th placed teams from the two Bayernligas enter a play-off for the remaining three places in the 2014–15 Bayernliga.

==== Group A ====
Group A is a four team group:

First round – first leg

28 May 2014

FC Viktoria Kahl	1–0	SpVgg Selbitz

28 May 2014

FSV Stadeln	0–3	SV Alemannia Haibach

First round – second leg

31 May 2014

SpVgg Selbitz	1–3	FC Viktoria Kahl

Viktoria Kahl won 4-1 on aggregate.

31 May 2014

SV Alemannia Haibach	2–2	FSV Stadeln

Alemannia Haibach won 5-2 on aggregate.

Second round – first leg

4 June 2014

FC Viktoria Kahl	1–2	SV Alemannia Haibach

Second round – second leg

7 June 2014

SV Alemannia Haibach	1–1	FC Viktoria Kahl

Alemannia Haibach won 3–2 on aggregate.

==== Group B ====
Group B is a three team group:

First round – first leg

28 May 2014

TSV Nördlingen	3–2	FC Affing

First round – second leg

31 May 2014

FC Affing	2–1	TSV Nördlingen

4-4 on aggregate. FC Affing won on away goals rule.

Second round – first leg

4 June 2014

DJK Vilzing	2–2	FC Affing

Second round – second leg

7 June 2014

FC Affing	0–1	DJK Vilzing

DJK Vilzing won 3–2 on aggregate.

==== Group C ====
Group C is a three team group:

First round – first leg

28 May 2014

TuS Holzkirchen	1–0	FC Ismaning

First round – second leg

31 May 2014

FC Ismaning	1–1	TuS Holzkirchen

TuS Holzkirchen won 2-1 on aggregate.

Second round – first leg

4 June 2014

TuS Holzkirchen	0–0	BCF Wolfratshausen

Second round – second leg

7 June 2014

BCF Wolfratshausen	2–1	TuS Holzkirchen

BCF Wolfratshausen won 2–1 on aggregate.
