= Dergahspor Nürnberg =

German football club

Dergahspor e.V.
- Full name: Dergahspor e.V.
- Founded: 1981
- Ground: Berthold-Brecht-Sportanlage
- Capacity: 4,000
- Chairman: Ibrahim Akbulut
- 1. Vorstand: Hamza Karagöz
- League: Landesliga Bayern-Nordost
- 2015–16: 9th
Home colours	Away colours

Dergahspor Nuremberg is a German football club based in Nuremberg.

== History ==
The club was officially founded on 26 August 1981 in the Bavarian city of Nuremberg by Turkish immigrants, and is nowadays one of the main football clubs in the city, open to all nationalities.

At the time of being founded, nobody could foresee the enormous success that this club would have. However, as all clubs in Amateur leagues, Dergahspor suffered ups and downs. Due to the great solidarity of its members the club and its first football team could celebrate some successful years.

The first achievement was in 1987, as the team won the 'Atatürk-Cup'. A competition between all Turkish clubs in Nuremberg, hosted by the Turkish consulate. At that time nobody would have imagined, that the club would win this competition on the national level between against other Turkish clubs in Germany.

Since 2000 the main team of the club celebrated various ascends up to the second highest league in Bavaria, the Landesliga. In 2012 the ascend to the highest class, the Bayernliga was only failed in relegation games against FC Amberg.

Although Dergahspor was founded by Turkish immigrants, the club considers itself as a German club with its roots in Nuremberg. Politically neutral and undenominational. Young players, no matter their nationality or religion are welcome.

In the Landesliga-Season 2106/2017 Dergahspor is competing in Landesliga Nordost in Bavaria.

== Current squad ==
As of 1 September 2016

Note: Flags indicate national team as defined under FIFA eligibility rules; some limited exceptions apply. Players may hold more than one non-FIFA nationality.

No.	Pos.	Nation	Player
1	GK	(Germany) GER	Fabian Stampka
2	DF	(Turkey) TUR	Volkan Akbulut
3	DF	(Greece) GRE	Dimitrios Nakou
4	DF	(Turkey) TUR	Ermirhan Karaslaan
5	DF	(Austria) AUT	Sanel Causevic
6	MF	(Germany) GER	Orhan Akgül
7	MF	(Germany) GER	Mustafa Köseoglu
9	FW	(Liberia) LBR	Michel Okai
10	FW	(Germany) GER	Engin Kaender

No.	Pos.	Nation	Player
13	FW	(Canada) CAN	Jean Francois Gonzalez Cruz
18	MF	(Venezuela) VEN	Juan Ignacio Dominguez
19	FW	(Turkey) TUR	Arcan Yanac
22	GK	(Germany) GER	Erdem Ünal
29	MF	(Serbia) SRB	Mustafa Jasarevic
38	DF	(Germany) GER	Jakob Neumann
52	FW	(Cameroon) CMR	Michel Mongue
99	MF	(Turkey) TUR	Mehmet Menekse

== League positions since 2010 ==
Year	Division (Tier)	Position
2011–12	BOL Mittelfranken (7)	2nd
2011–12	Landesliga Mitte (6)	12th
2012–13	Landesliga Nordost (6)	5th
2013–14	Landesliga Nordost (6)	12th
2014–15	Landesliga Nordost (6)	12th
2015–16	Landesliga Nordost (6)	9th

== Honours ==
- Atatürk Cup:
  - Champions 1987
- Atatürk Cup:
  - Champions 2007
- Bayernliga:
  - Participant ascention round 2012
