= ASV Hollfeld =

- Full name: Allgemeiner Sportverein 1900 Hollfeld e.V.
- Founded: 27 June 1900
- Ground: Sportplatz Kulmbacher Straße
- Capacity: 1,000
- Manager: Jochen Hollfelder
- League: Bezirksliga Oberfranken-Ost (VII)
- 2018–19: A-Klasse Bayreuth (VIII), 1st ↑
Home colours	Away colours

The ASV Hollfeld is a German association football club from the town of Hollfeld, Bavaria.

The club's greatest success came in 2012 when it qualified for the new northern division of the expanded Bayernliga, the fifth tier of the German football league system, where it played for two seasons until 2014.

== History ==
For most of its history the club has been a non-descript amateur side in local Bavarian football, on occasion rising as far as the Bezirksliga. The club was originally formed as the gymnastics club TV Hollfeld in June 1900 but changed to its current name in 1929 when a football department was established. The club's rise through the divisions began in the mid-2000s. In 2006 it earned promotion to the tier seven Bezirksliga Oberfranken-Ost where it finished champions in its first season there and won promotion to the Bezirksoberliga.

Playing in the Bezirksoberliga Oberfranken in 2007–08 the club finished runners-up in the league was promoted to the Landesliga.

ASV Hollfeld played for the next four seasons in the Landesliga Bayern-Nord until this league was disbanded in 2012. In the Landesliga the club finished on all occasions in the lower half of the table. However, a fourteenth place was enough to qualify the club for the new northern division of the Bayernliga after success in the promotion round, overcoming SV Friesen and TSV Neudrossenfeld in the process.

Hollfeld played for two seasons in the Bayernliga Nord, coming fourteenth in its first year. An eighteenth place in the second season meant the club was relegated and forced to step down to the Landesliga Bayern-Nordost. In the Landesliga, in 2014–15, the club finished last in the league and was relegated once more, now to the Bezirksliga. A last-place finish in the Bezirksliga in 2015–16 meant another drop for the club, now to the A-Klasse, which Bayreuth won for the first time in 2019, climbing them up to the Bezirksliga once more.

== Honours ==
The club's honours:

- Bezirksoberliga Oberfranken
  - Runners-up: 2008
- Bezirksliga Oberfranken-Ost
  - Champions: 2007
- A-Klasse Bayreuth
  - Champions: 2019
  - Runners-up: 2006
- Kreisklasse Bayreuth 1
  - Runners-up: 2005

== Recent seasons ==
The recent season-by-season performance of the club:

Season	Division	Tier	Position
2004–05	Kreisklasse Bayreuth 1	IX	2nd ↑
2005–06	A-Klasse Bayreuth	VIII	2nd ↑
2006–07	Bezirksliga Oberfranken-Ost	VII	1st ↑
2007–08	Bezirksoberliga Oberfranken	VI	2nd ↑
2008–09	Landesliga Bayern-Nord	VI	15th
2009–10	Landesliga Bayern-Nord	VI	13th
2010–11	Landesliga Bayern-Nord	VI	11th
2011–12	Landesliga Bayern-Nord	VI	14th ↑
2012–13	Bayernliga Nord	V	14th
2013–14	Bayernliga Nord	V	18th ↓
2014–15	Landesliga Bayern-Nordost	VI	18th ↓
2015–16	Bezirksliga Oberfranken-Ost	VII	16th ↓
2016–17	A-Klasse Bayreuth	VIII	3rd
2017–18	A-Klasse Bayreuth	VIII	9th
2018–19	A-Klasse Bayreuth	VIII	1st ↑
2019–20	Bezirksliga Oberfranken-Ost	VII	

- With the introduction of the Bezirksoberligas in 1988 as the new fifth tier, below the Landesligas, all leagues below dropped one tier. With the introduction of the Regionalligas in 1994 and the 3. Liga in 2008 as the new third tier, below the 2. Bundesliga, all leagues below dropped one tier. With the establishment of the Regionalliga Bayern as the new fourth tier in Bavaria in 2012 the Bayernliga was split into a northern and a southern division, the number of Landesligas expanded from three to five and the Bezirksoberligas abolished. All leagues from the Bezirksligas onwards were elevated one tier.

=== Key ===
↑ Promoted	↓ Relegated
