= SV Memmelsdorf =

German football club

- Full name: Sportverein 1923 Memmelsdorf e.V.
- Founded: 7 December 1923
- Ground: Schmittenau-Stadion
- Capacity: 4,000
- Chairman: Herbert Massak
- Manager: Bernd Eigner
- League: Landesliga Bayern-Nordwest (VI)
- 2015–16: 10th
Home colours	Away colours

The SV Memmelsdorf is a German association football club from the city of Memmelsdorf, Bavaria. The club played for a season in the Oberliga Bayern in 2009–10, having achieved promotion to this league for the first time.

== History ==
Formed on 7 December 1923, SVM was not the first football club formed in the village of Memmelsdorf, near Bamberg. An earlier club had existed for a brief period from the end of the First World War to 1923 but was then disbanded. Josef Bauer, a local trader, was the driving force behind the new club and became its chairman, an office he held until 1933.

The new club played its first game of football on 24 December 1934, losing 5–2 to TB Jahn Bamberg. The club's early years were spent in the local C- and B-Klasse, but, in 1931, it won promotion to the A-Klasse Bamberg for the first time. Also in 1931, the club changed its colours from black and white to red and white.

Memmelsdorf remained in the A-Klasse for three seasons before being relegated again. A period of decline followed, culminating in a withdrawal from competitive football because of a lack of players in 1938. The outbreak of the Second World War did not improve this situation and SVM remained dormant for a time.

After the end of the war in 1945, the club needed permission from the local occupation authorities, Bavaria was in the US-zone, but it was now able to field a team in local league football again. The club had to restart at the bottom of the league pyramid, the C-Klasse, but returned to the A-Klasse by 1953. SVM stayed for only one season in this league but returned in 1955 and became a more permanent member, lasting until 1968.

Once more, the club returned to the A-Klasse, now the sixth tier of league football in the region, in 1971. The 1975–76 season saw the club reach new heights, finishing second in the A-Klasse. In the promotion round, it faced VfL Frohnlach, which it beat 2–1 and earned promotion to the Bezirksliga Oberfranken-West for the first time.

The club performed well in this new league and came second in 1977–78 but lost its greatest talent, 20-year-old Joachim Pickel in a car accident. It played in the 1978–79 German Cup, where it lost 8–1 at home to 1. FC Bocholt. SVM remained a good side in the Bezirksliga but it took until 1987 to get another shot at promotion. Finishing second on equal points with SV Hallstadt, a decider had to be played in Bamberg and SVM won 6–3 in front of 1,200 spectators. The team then had to face ATS Kulmbach, which it beat 3–2, courtesy to a 90th-minute goal. In the decisive third game, it beat FC Eibelstadt 2–0 and earned promotion to the Landesliga Bayern-Nord (IV) for the first time. Because of the relegation of local powerhouse 1. FC Bamberg to the Bezirksliga that year, the team also became the highest-ranking club in the city of Bamberg.

The club managed to establish itself well in the new league surprised everyone when it finished second in the 1988–89 season. The team thereby earned the right to take part in the Oberliga promotion round, where it faced SpVgg Fürth and lost 5–3. The game, in front of 4,500 spectators was a highlight in the club's history. Fürth in turn had to wait another two years to return to the Bayernliga, losing to FC Memmingen in the promotion final.

The team remained a competitive side in the Landesliga in the following years, without quite achieving as highly again. In 1993, the club suffered relegation, now to the Bezirksoberliga Oberfranken (V). After a number of good seasons there, 1996–97 became a struggle, with the team only surviving after having to win two relegation deciders. It was followed by a league championship and promotion back to the Landesliga in 1998–99.

Memmelsdorfs second stint in the Landesliga was not as successful as its first and it never broke through into the top-ranks of the league in its six seasons there. In 2005, it was relegated once more to the Bezirksoberliga.

The club only spend two seasons there before returning to the Landesliga on the strength of another league championship. A stronger side now, it finished eighth in its first season. In 2008–09, it took out the league championship there and earned promotion to the Oberliga Bayern for the first time, where it lasted for only one season before being relegated again.

At the end of the 2011–12 season the club qualified directly for the newly expanded Bayernliga after finishing fifth in the Landesliga. After finishing in last place in 2014–15 the club was relegated back to the Landesliga.

== Honours ==
- Landesliga Bayern-Nord (VI)
  - Champions: 2009
  - Runners-up: 1989
- Bezirksoberliga Oberfranken (VI)
  - Champions: (2) 1999, 2007

== Recent seasons ==
The recent season-by-season performance of the club:

Season	Division	Tier	Position
1999–2000	Landesliga Bayern-Nord	V	10th
2000–01	Landesliga Bayern-Nord	V	14th
2001–02	Landesliga Bayern-Nord	V	7th
2002–03	Landesliga Bayern-Nord	V	12th
2003–04	Landesliga Bayern-Nord	V	9th
2004–05	Landesliga Bayern-Nord	V	15th ↓
2005–06	Bezirksoberliga Oberfranken	VI	5th
2006–07	Bezirksoberliga Oberfranken	VI	1st ↑
2007–08	Landesliga Bayern-Nord	V	8th
2008–09	Landesliga Bayern-Nord	VI	1st ↑
2009–10	Bayernliga	V	17th ↓
2010–11	Landesliga Bayern-Nord	VI	10th
2011–12	Landesliga Bayern-Nord	VI	5th ↑
2012–13	Bayernliga Nord	V	9th
2013–14	Bayernliga Nord	V	13th
2014–15	Bayernliga Nord	V	18th ↓
2015–16	Landesliga Bayern-Nordwest	VI	10th
2016–17	Landesliga Bayern-Nordwest	VI	

- With the introduction of the Bezirksoberligas in 1988 as the new fifth tier, below the Landesligas, all leagues below dropped one tier. With the introduction of the Regionalligas in 1994 and the 3. Liga in 2008 as the new third tier, below the 2. Bundesliga, all leagues below dropped one tier. With the establishment of the Regionalliga Bayern as the new fourth tier in Bavaria in 2012 the Bayernliga was split into a northern and a southern division, the number of Landesligas expanded from three to five and the Bezirksoberligas abolished. All leagues from the Bezirksligas onwards were elevated one tier.

↑ Promoted	↓ Relegated

== DFB Cup appearances ==
The club has qualified for the first round of the German Cup just once:

Season	Round	Date	Home	Away	Result	Attendance
DFB Cup 1978-79	First round	5 August 1978	SV Memmelsdorf	1. FC Bocholt	1–8	1,000
