= 1. FC Lichtenfels =

German football club

- Full name: 1. Fußball-Club Lichtenfels von 1906 e.V.
- Founded: 1906
- Ground: Karl Fleschutz Stadion
- Capacity: 4,500
- Chairman: Bernd Legal
- League: Landesliga Bayern-Nordost (VI)
- 2016–17: Landesliga Bayern-Nordwest (VI), 8th
Home colours	Away colours

The 1. FC Lichtenfels is a German association football club from the city of Lichtenfels, Bavaria.

== History ==
Formed in 1906, the club did not rise to prominence till after the Second World War, when it earned promotion to the tier-two Landesliga Bayern in 1946. The team became a dominant side in the northern division of this league, finishing second in 1947 and 1948.

For the 1948–49 season, the league was reduced to a single division and the club came third behind Jahn Regensburg and SpVgg Fürth, who were both promoted to the Oberliga Süd. The following season, when the new 2nd Oberliga Süd was to be formed, a finish in the top-five was necessary to qualify but FCL only came tenth and had to remain in what was to become the tier-three Amateurliga Bayern. The club remained a strong side and came third once more in 1951. From 1953 onwards, the Amateurliga was split into a northern and a southern group and Lichtenfels became part of the north.

It took part in the 1954 edition of the German amateur football championship but was knocked out in the group stage.

Second place finishes in 1954, 1956 and 1957 were the prelude to a league championship in 1959–60 under player-manager Željko Čajkovski. The team then went on to face Schwaben Augsburg in the final of the Bavarian championship, which it won 5–3 in Augsburg. Through this performance, the club qualified for the promotion round to the second division but missed out to Borussia Fulda there.

After this, the club's performances in the next two seasons dropped off but it managed to finish sixth in 1963, when only the top-seven qualified for the new single-division Amateurliga Bayern. The club holds top spot in the all-time table of this era of the Bayernliga from 1945 to 1963, having spent 17 seasons at this level, more than any other club.

In the new era of German football, after the inception of the Bundesliga in 1963, Lichtenfels continued as a good side in the Amateurliga, finishing fourth in 1966 and 1969 as its best results. The 1969–70 season became another highlight in the club history, finishing second, three points behind FC Wacker München. This result qualified the team for the German amateur championship once more, where it was knocked out by VfL Neckarau in the quarter finals.

The club's performances after this quickly slipped and in 1973 a 17th place meant relegation from the Bayernliga after 27 continued seasons. The club was never to return to this level. (2010).

Lichtenfels became part of the tier-four Landesliga Bayern-Nord from 1973 onwards, where it finished third in its first season. The club achieved a number of upper table finishes but was relegated from the league in 1978 after coming last, 14 points clear of salvation. Its new league now was the Bezirksliga Oberfranken West, the fifth tier of league football.

It took until 1982 to recover from this fall, when it returned to the Landesliga. Six seasons of lower-table finishes followed before the club was relegated once more in 1988, now to the new Bezirksoberliga Oberfranken.

The club returned twice from this league to the Landesliga, in 1991 on the strength of a second place and in 1994 through a championship. In 1989, it missed out on promotion when it came equal second with SV Mitterteich and lost a decider. The club enjoyed some better seasons in the Landesliga in 1994–95 and 1995–96 but was relegated again in 1998.

Upon return to the Bezirksoberliga, it remained a top side, finishing fourth in 1999 and fifth the year after. It slipped to mid-field after a third place in 2001 and was relegated once more in 2004, to the Bezirksliga with only two wins out of 30 games.

FCL dropped another level the season after, down to the Kreisliga, to tier eight. In this league, it met with Kickers Neustadt Wildenheid a team that had seen better times, too, albeit under a different name. Since 2006 the club has been playing in the Bezirksliga, now the seventh tier of the league system.

In July 2008, the club could attract the 1. FC Nürnberg for a pre-season match, losing 3–0 in front of 4,200 spectators in Lichtenfeld. In the 2008–09 season, the club barely survived, finishing one point above the relegation ranks, ahead of the FC Kronach, another former great from Oberfranken whose history is closely tied with FCL.

Lichtenfels won its Bezirksliga division in 2015–16 and earned promotion to the Landesliga.

== Honours ==
The club's honours:

=== League ===
- Landesliga Nordbayern (II)
  - Runners-up: (2) 1947, 1948
- Amateurliga Nordbayern (III)
  - Champions: 1960
  - Runners-up: (3) 1954, 1956, 1957
- Amateurliga Bayern (III)
  - Runners-up: 1970
- Bezirksoberliga Oberfranken (V)
  - Champions: 1994
  - Runners-up: 1991
- Bezirksliga Oberfranken West
  - Champions: 2016
  - Runners-up: 2012

=== Cup ===
- Bavarian Cup
  - Winners: 1950

== Recent seasons ==
The recent season-by-season performance of the club:

Season	Division	Tier	Position
1999–2000	Bezirksoberliga Oberfranken	VI	6th
2000–01	Bezirksoberliga Oberfranken	VI	3rd
2001–02	Bezirksoberliga Oberfranken	VI	9th
2002–03	Bezirksoberliga Oberfranken	VI	6th
2003–04	Bezirksoberliga Oberfranken	VI	16th ↓
2004–05	Bezirksliga Oberfranken West	VII	13th ↓
2005–06	Kreisliga Coburg	VIII	2nd ↑
2006–07	Bezirksliga Oberfranken West	VII	9th
2007–08	Bezirksliga Oberfranken West	VII	7th
2008–09	Bezirksliga Oberfranken West	VIII	12th
2009–10	Bezirksliga Oberfranken West	VIII	3rd
2010–11	Bezirksliga Oberfranken West	VIII	9th
2011–12	Bezirksliga Oberfranken West	VIII	2nd
2012–13	Bezirksliga Oberfranken West	VII	6th
2013–14	Bezirksliga Oberfranken West	VII	10th
2014–15	Bezirksliga Oberfranken West	VII	4th
2015–16	Bezirksliga Oberfranken West	VII	1st ↑
2016–17	Landesliga Bayern-Nordwest	VI	8th
2017–18	Landesliga Bayern-Nordost	VI	

- With the introduction of the Bezirksoberligas in 1988 as the new fifth tier, below the Landesligas, all leagues below dropped one tier. With the introduction of the Regionalligas in 1994 and the 3. Liga in 2008 as the new third tier, below the 2. Bundesliga, all leagues below dropped one tier. With the establishment of the Regionalliga Bayern as the new fourth tier in Bavaria in 2012 the Bayernliga was split into a northern and a southern division, the number of Landesligas expanded from three to five and the Bezirksoberligas abolished. All leagues from the Bezirksligas onwards were elevated one tier.

=== Key ===
↑ Promoted	↓ Relegated
