= DVV Coburg =

German football club

- Full name: DJK Viktoria VfB Coburg e. V.
- Founded: 2000
- Dissolved: 2012
- Ground: Stadion am hinteren Floßanger
- Capacity: 3,000
- League: defunct
- 2011–12: Bezirksoberliga Oberfranken (VII), 10th
Home colours	Away colours

The DVV Coburg (full name: Deutsche Jugend Kraft Viktoria Verein für Bewegungsspiele Coburg e.V.) was a German association football club from the town of Coburg, Bavaria. Coburg became part of Bavaria in 1920, after the First World War.

The club was formed in 2000, when VfB Coburg merged with local side DJK/Viktoria Coburg. Of the three clubs, VfB was by far the most notable, spending 21 seasons in the tier three Fußball-Bayernliga from 1952 to 1984. The club also made a single appearance in the DFB-Pokal (German Cup) in 1977–78, losing 3–0 at fellow amateurs TuS Langerwehe.

DVV was disbanded on 30 June 2012, having declared insolvency in June 2011 owing Euro 118,000 to the German tax department. The club was succeeded by FC Coburg, which took over the league place of DVV.

== History ==
=== VfB Coburg ===
The logo of VfB Coburg

The club was formed in 1907 as Coburger FC before becoming VfB sometime before 1920. They were joined by FC Germania Coburg in 1923 and by FC Viktoria Coburg in 1933.

As FC they took part in the playoff round of the regional central German league (Verbands Mitteldeutscher Ballspiel-Vereine, VMVB) in 1914, making it through the qualification round to an eighth-final match before going out. Historically part of the state of Thuringia, Coburg voted in a plebiscite in 1920 to join the neighbouring state of Bavaria. However, VfB continued to compete as part of central region football and again in 1929 took part in the VMVB playoffs, advancing to the semi-finals where they lost to Dresdner SC.

Germany's historical regional leagues were replaced by 16 new regional top-flight divisions in 1933 and Coburg finally became part of Bavarian competition. The team won promotion to the Gauliga Bayern for a single season in 1936–37 and made one more appearance there in 1938–39. They failed in qualification attempts in 1938 and 1941. Early in 1942, during World War II, they were merged with the military club Wehrmacht SV Coburg to play as the wartime side Kriegspielgemeinschaft Coburg. As the war progressed play in the Gauliga Bayern was broken up into a number of small local divisions before being abandoned in late 1944 as the conflict overtook the area.

The club became a member of the Amateurliga Nordayern, the northern division of the Bayernliga, in 1952, playing the next ten seasons in the league until 1962, when it was relegated. In this era, the club achieved two fourth-place finishes as its best result, in 1957–58 and 1958–59.

With the reorganisation of the German league system in 1963, the club did not become a founding member of the new fourth division Landesliga Bayern-Nord in the region but was promoted to the league in 1966. As a newcomer, the club took out the league championship in 1967 and earned another promotion.

Back in the Bayernliga in 1967–68, which was now played as a single division league, the club played three successful seasons, with a fifth place as its best result, but came 18th in its fourth year and was relegated again.

After a third-place finish in the Landesliga in 1971–72, the side won the league the following year and was promoted once more.

Coburg was back in the Bayernliga for five consecutive seasons again but, except for the first year, the club struggled against relegation and went down again in 1978.

In the Landesliga, from 1978 to 1982, VfB played a leading role, improving season by season, and earned promotion again at the end of the 1981–82 season.

Back for its last stint in the Bayernliga, Coburg finished tenth in 1982–83 but came 19th in the following year and made a permanent departure from this league level.

The club was still a strong side in the Landesliga after 1984, finishing in the top half of the league for the next four seasons. At the end of the 1988–89 season however it fell to regional play, the Bezirksoberliga Oberfranken. It spent three seasons there before returning to the Landesliga in 1992. Back in the Landesliga for three more years, the club was never able to reach former heights and, when relegation came once more in 1995, it was a permanent departure from the league.

After four years at Bezirksoberliga level, the club suffered another relegation in 1999, now to the Bezirksliga Oberfranken-West. At this level, in the club's final season before the merger in 2000, VfB finished third while DJK/Viktoria came eleventh in the same league.

=== DJK/Viktoria Coburg ===
DJK/Viktoria Coburg was established in 1974 in a merger of FC Viktoria 09 Coburg, formed 1909, and DJK Rot-Weiß Coburg, formed 1931. Both clubs, unlike VfB, had been banned by the Nazis and were reformed after the Second World War.

DJK/Viktoria was promoted to the Bezirksoberliga Oberfranken in 1989, the year VfB was relegated to the league, causing the two clubs to meet for the first time in league play in 1989–90. The club lasted for four seasons at this level before returning to the Bezirksliga in 1993. The club remained at this level for its final seven seasons, never coming close to promotion again.

=== DVV Coburg ===
The new club was an instant success, taking out two consecutive league championships in 2001 and 2002, first in the Bezirksliga, than in the Bezirksoberliga.

DVV played for four seasons in the Landesliga from 2002, with a seventh place as its best result. It dropped to Bezirksoberliga level for a season before returning to the Landesliga for another four years. In 2011, affected by financial trouble, the club was relegated once more.

The club played its final season in the Bezirksoberliga in 2011–12 as both DVV and the league were disbanded at the end of the season. At the end the club dropped back to the Bezirksliga after finishing tenth in the Bezirksoberliga and losing to TBVfL Neustadt in the promotion round but remained at the same tier as the Bezirksoberliga was disbanded. The new club, FC Coburg, was eventually given permission to take over the league places of DVV in senior and youth football.

== Honours ==
The club's honours:

=== League ===
- 2nd Amateurliga Oberfranken-West
  - Champions: 1952
- Landesliga Bayern-Nord
  - Champions: 1967, 1973, 1982
  - Runners-up: 1981
- Bezirksoberliga Oberfranken
  - Champions: 1992, 2002
  - Runners-up: 2007
- Bezirksliga Oberfranken-West
  - Champions: 1989^{†}, 2001
- ^{†} Won by DJK/Viktoria, all other honours are for VfB and DVV.

== Recent managers ==
Recent managers of the club:

Manager	Start	Finish
Stefan Braungardt		2011
Olaf Teuchert	2011	2012

== Recent seasons ==
The recent season-by-season performance of the club:

Season	Division	Tier	Position
2000–01	Bezirksliga Oberfranken-West	VII	1st ↑
2001–02	Bezirksoberliga Oberfranken	VI	1st ↑
2002–03	Landesliga Bayern-Nord	V	8th
2003–04	Landesliga Bayern-Nord	V	12th
2004–05	Landesliga Bayern-Nord	V	7th
2005–06	Landesliga Bayern-Nord	V	16th ↓
2006–07	Bezirksoberliga Oberfranken	VI	2nd ↑
2007–08	Landesliga Bayern-Nord	V	13th
2008–09	Landesliga Bayern-Nord	VI	11th
2009–10	Landesliga Bayern-Nord	VI	9th
2010–11	Landesliga Bayern-Nord	VI	18th ↓
2011–12	Bezirksoberliga Oberfranken	VII	10th

- With the introduction of the Bezirksoberligas in 1988 as the new fifth tier, below the Landesligas, all leagues below dropped one tier. With the introduction of the Regionalligas in 1994 and the 3. Liga in 2008 as the new third tier, below the 2. Bundesliga, all leagues below dropped one tier. With the establishment of the Regionalliga Bayern as the new fourth tier in Bavaria in 2012 the Bayernliga was split into a northern and a southern division, the number of Landesligas expanded from three to five and the Bezirksoberligas abolished. All leagues from the Bezirksligas onward were elevated one tier.

↑ Promoted	↓ Relegated

== DFB Cup appearances ==
The club has qualified for the first round of the German Cup just once, as then VfB Coburg:

Season	Round	Date	Home	Away	Result	Attendance
1977–78	First round	29 July 1977	TuS Langerwehe	VfB Coburg	3–0	800
