= TSV Neudrossenfeld =

- Full name: Turn- und Sportverein Neudrossenfeld e. V.
- Founded: 21 June 1924; 102 years ago
- Ground: Sportgelände Am Weinberg
- Chairman: Gerald Weinrich
- Manager: Andreas Baumer
- League: Bayernliga Nord (V)
- 2025–26: Bayernliga Nord, 11th of 18
Home colours

The TSV Neudrossenfeld is a German association football club from the town of Neudrossenfeld, Bavaria.

The club's greatest success came in 2014 when it qualified for the northern division of the Bayernliga, the fifth tier of the German football league system.

== History ==
For most of its history the club, formed on 21 June 1924, has been a non-descript amateur side in local Bavarian football. The club first rose above local Kreisliga football in 1990 when it won promotion to the Bezirksliga Oberfranken-Ost. It spent four seasons in the lower half of the table before being relegated again in 1994. The club promptly returned to the Bezirksliga in 1995 but again lasted for only four seasons before suffering another relegation in 1999. Neudrossenfeld won its third promotion to the Bezirksliga in 2004 for a third stint of four seasons. This time however the club was a stronger side and capped the four seasons with a league championship in 2008.

Promoted to the tier seven Bezirksoberliga Oberfranken TSV finished runners-up in its first season there and was immediately promoted another level, now to the Landesliga Bayern-Nord.

The club played in the Landesliga for the next five seasons, the first three in the Landesliga Nord with average success. In 2012 this league was disbanded when the Landesligas were expanded from three to five divisions. Neudrossenfeld was grouped in the Landesliga Bayern-Nordost where it came sixth in 2013, followed by a league championship the season after.

The later allowed the club to move up to the Bayernliga for the first time, competing in the northern division in 2014–15. After a seventeenth place in 2014–15 the club had to enter the relegation round, where it lost to SpVgg Selbitz and was relegated.

== Honours ==
The club's honours:

- Landesliga Bayern-Nordost
  - Champions: 2014
- Bezirksoberliga Oberfranken
  - Runners-up: 2009
- Bezirksliga Oberfranken-Ost
  - Champions: 2008

== Recent seasons ==
The recent season-by-season performance of the club:

Season	Division	Tier	Position
1999–2000			
2000–01			
2001–02			
2002–03			
2003–04	Kreisliga	VIII	↑
2004–05	Bezirksliga Oberfranken-Ost	VII	6th
2005–06	Bezirksliga Oberfranken-Ost	VII	8th
2006–07	Bezirksliga Oberfranken-Ost	VII	9th
2007–08	Bezirksliga Oberfranken-Ost	VII	1st ↑
2008–09	Bezirksoberliga Oberfranken	VII	2nd ↑
2009–10	Landesliga Bayern-Nord	VI	7th
2010–11	Landesliga Bayern-Nord	VI	8th
2011–12	Landesliga Bayern-Nord	VI	11th
2012–13	Landesliga Bayern-Nordost	VI	6th
2013–14	Landesliga Bayern-Nordost	VI	1st ↑
2014–15	Bayernliga Nord	V	17th ↓
2015–16	Landesliga Bayern-Nordost	VI	5th
2016–17	Landesliga Bayern-Nordost	VI	8th
2017–18	Landesliga Bayern-Nordost	VI	4th
2018–19	Landesliga Bayern-Nordost	VI	3rd
2019–21	Landesliga Bayern-Nordost	VI	5th
2022–23	Landesliga Bayern-Nordost	VI	

- With the introduction of the Bezirksoberligas in 1988 as the new fifth tier, below the Landesligas, all leagues below dropped one tier. With the introduction of the Regionalligas in 1994 and the 3. Liga in 2008 as the new third tier, below the 2. Bundesliga, all leagues below dropped one tier. With the establishment of the Regionalliga Bayern as the new fourth tier in Bavaria in 2012 the Bayernliga was split into a northern and a southern division, the number of Landesligas expanded from three to five and the Bezirksoberligas abolished. All leagues from the Bezirksligas onwards were elevated one tier.

=== Key ===
↑ Promoted	↓ Relegated
