= 1. FC Trogen =

- Full name: 1. Fußballclub Trogen 1932 e.V.
- Founded: 26 May 1932
- Ground: Sportplatz Am Bühl
- Chairman: Dietmer Haase
- Manager: Florian Narr
- League: Bezirksliga Oberfranken-Ost (VII)
- 2015–16: 6th
Home colours	Away colours

The 1. FC Trogen is a German association football club from the town of Trogen, Bavaria.

The club's greatest success came in 2012 when it qualified for the new northern division of the expanded Bayernliga, the fifth tier of the German football league system but lasted for only one season before being relegated again.

== History ==
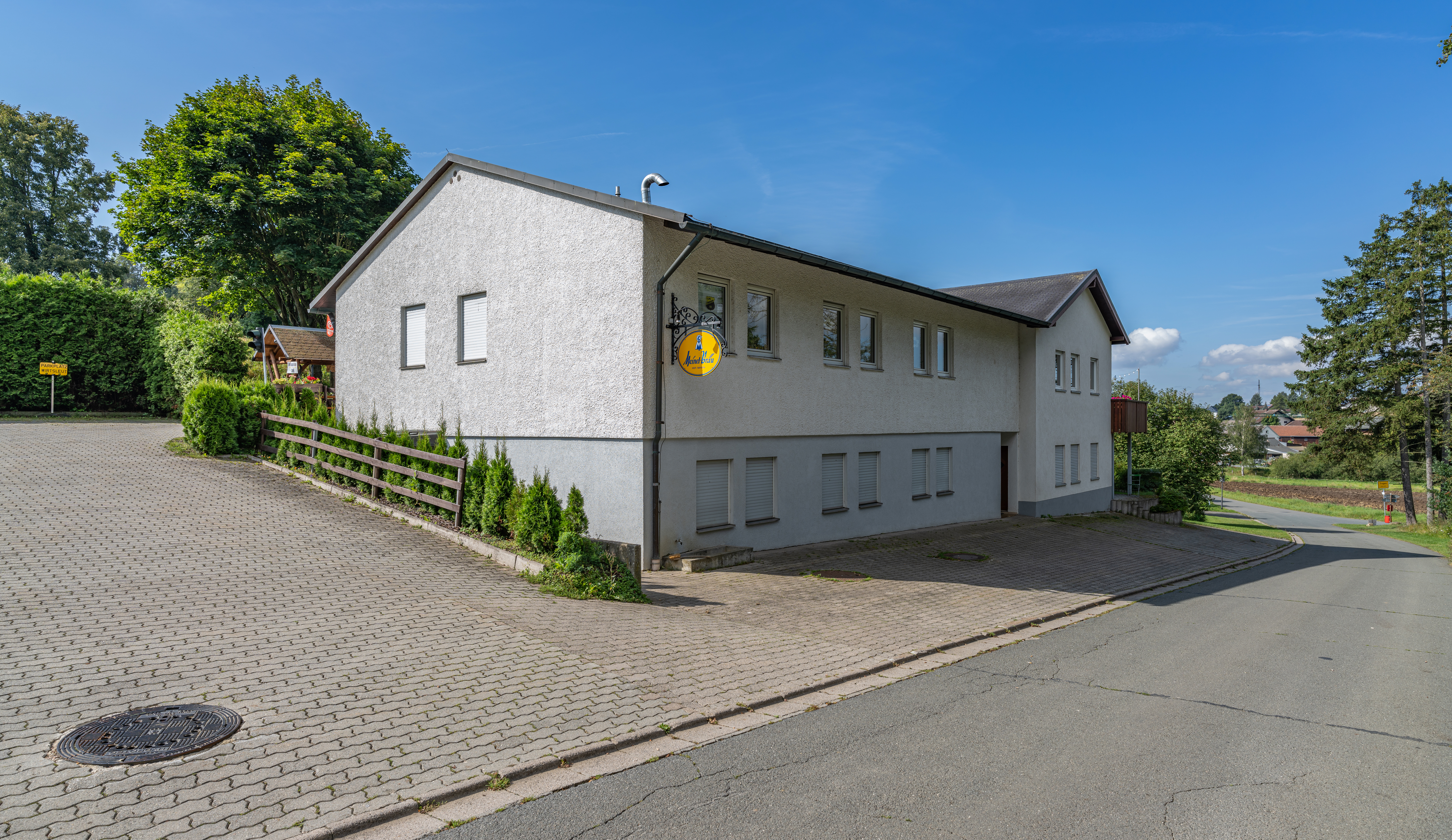
Clubhouse of 1. FC Trogen

For most of its history the club has been a non-descript amateur side in local Bavarian football. An early football club, the SpVgg Trogen existed in Trogen from 1920 to 1926, when it was dissolved again. The current club, 1. FC Trogen, was formed six years later, in 1932. Trogen played in the A-Klasse, now Kreisliga, Hof from 1954 to 1969 and again from 1974 to 1978. It won the league in 1978 and earned promotion to the Bezirksliga where it lasted for two seasons. A decline followed that took the club to the C-Klasse, the lowest league in Bavaria, by 1990. A decade of lower league football followed.

The club's rise through the Bavarian football leagues began in the early 2000s, winning the A-Klasse Hof in 2002, the Kreisklasse Hof in 2004 and the Kreisliga Hof in 2005.

Trogen came third in its first Bezirksliga Oberfranken-Ost and earned promotion to the Bezirksoberliga through the promotion round.

Playing in the Bezirksoberliga Oberfranken Trogen came seventh in its first season there, followed by a third place the season after. In the 2008–09 season the club won the league and earned another promotion, now to the Landesliga.

Trogen played for only one season in the Landesliga Bayern-Nord before being relegated again in 2010. The club promptly returned to the Landesliga the following season after a second Bezirksoberliga title and came eighth in the league in 2012, a high enough finish to qualify directly for the new northern division of the Bayernliga. Trogen lasted for only one season there before being relegated back to the Landesliga Bayern-Nordost. Again after only one season there the club suffered another relegation, now to the Bezirksliga.

== Honours ==
The club's honours:

- Bezirksoberliga Oberfranken
  - Champions: 2009, 2011
- Kreisliga Hof
  - Champions: 2005

== Recent seasons ==
The recent season-by-season performance of the club:

Season	Division	Tier	Position
1999–2000	A-Klasse Hof	X	
2000–01	A-Klasse Hof	X	
2001–02	A-Klasse Hof	X	1st ↑
2002–03	Kreisklasse Hof	IX	3rd
2003–04	Kreisklasse Hof	IX	1st ↑
2004–05	Kreisliga Hof	VIII	1st ↑
2005–06	Bezirksliga Oberfranken-Ost	VII	3rd ↑
2006–07	Bezirksoberliga Oberfranken	VI	7th
2007–08	Bezirksoberliga Oberfranken	VI	3rd
2008–09	Bezirksoberliga Oberfranken	VII	1st ↑
2009–10	Landesliga Bayern-Nord	VI	16th ↓
2010–11	Bezirksoberliga Oberfranken	VII	1st ↑
2011–12	Landesliga Bayern-Nord	VI	8th ↑
2012–13	Bayernliga Nord	V	15th ↓
2013–14	Landesliga Bayern-Nordost	VI	17th ↓
2014–15	Bezirksliga Oberfranken-Ost	VII	7th
2015–16	Bezirksliga Oberfranken-Ost	VII	6th
2016–17	Bezirksliga Oberfranken-Ost	VII	

- With the introduction of the Bezirksoberligas in 1988 as the new fifth tier, below the Landesligas, all leagues below dropped one tier. With the introduction of the Regionalligas in 1994 and the 3. Liga in 2008 as the new third tier, below the 2. Bundesliga, all leagues below dropped one tier. With the establishment of the Regionalliga Bayern as the new fourth tier in Bavaria in 2012 the Bayernliga was split into a northern and a southern division, the number of Landesligas expanded from three to five and the Bezirksoberligas abolished. All leagues from the Bezirksligas onwards were elevated one tier.

=== Key ===
↑ Promoted	↓ Relegated
