= TSV Hirschaid =

German football club

- Full name: Turn- und Sportverein Hirschaid
- Founded: 1913
- Ground: Regnitzau
- Capacity: 4,000
- Chairman: Michael Junge
- Manager: Daniel Schäffler
- League: Kreisliga Bamberg (VIII)
- 2018–19: 5th
Home colours	Away colours

TSV Hirschaid is a German association football club from the town of Hirschaid, Bavaria.

The club also has departments badminton, basketball, Judo, skiing, athletics, chess, swimming, table tennis, gymnastics, and hiking.

== History ==
The club was established as the gymnastics club Turnverein Hirschaid on 15 June 1913. A football department was formed within the club in 1920 and became independent on 30 August 1924 as SpVgg Hirschaid. The footballers re-joined their parent club following World War II on 11 November 1945 and the reunited club took on its present name.

The footballers managed a single season advance to the Amateuroberliga Bayern (V) in the 1978–79 season, but were immediately relegated. They also appeared in the opening round of the DFB-Pokal (German Cup) in 1981, where they were put out by Würtzburger Kickers (2:1)

The club became a founding member of the Bezirksoberliga Oberfranken in 1988 and the leagues first champion. It played in the Landesliga Bayern-Nord for a season in 198–90 but was relegated again back to the Bezirksoberliga. The club quickly declined, dropping out of the Bezirksoberliga in 1992 and the Bezirksliga below in 1994. A period in the lower amateur leagues followed that only ended in the early 2000s. TSV once more advanced to the Bezirksoberliga and finished as high as third there but dropped back to the Bezirksliga again in 2009. After four seasons in the Bezirksliga the club came close to relegation to the Kreisliga in 2014 but ultimately survived. The following season the club had to enter the relegation play-off and lost, so it dropped down to the Kreisliga.

== Honours ==
The club's honours:

- Landesliga Bayern-Nord
  - Champions: 1978
- Bezirksoberliga Oberfranken
  - Champions: 1989
- Bezirksliga Oberfranken-West
  - Champions: 1976
  - Runners-up: 2004

== Recent seasons ==
The recent season-by-season performance of the club:

Season	Division	Tier	Position
2001–02	Bezirksliga Oberfranken-West	VII	8th
2002–03	Bezirksliga Oberfranken-West	VII	5th
2003–04	Bezirksliga Oberfranken-West	VII	2nd ↑
2004–05	Bezirksoberliga Oberfranken	VI	7th
2005–06	Bezirksoberliga Oberfranken	VI	6th
2006–07	Bezirksoberliga Oberfranken	VI	3rd
2007–08	Bezirksoberliga Oberfranken	VI	8th
2008–09	Bezirksoberliga Oberfranken	VII	6th
2009–10	Bezirksoberliga Oberfranken	VII	13th ↓
2010–11	Bezirksliga Oberfranken-West	VIII	10th
2011–12	Bezirksliga Oberfranken-West	VIII	6th
2012–13	Bezirksliga Oberfranken West	VII	11th
2013–14	Bezirksliga Oberfanken-West	VII	17th
2014–15	Bezirksliga Oberfanken-West	VII	14th ↓
2015–16	Kreisliga Bamberg	VIII	13th
2016–17	Kreisliga Bamberg	VIII	7th
2017–18	Kreisliga Bamberg	VIII	8th
2018–19	Kreisliga Bamberg	VIII	5th

- With the introduction of the Bezirksoberligas in 1988 as the new fifth tier, below the Landesligas, all leagues below dropped one tier. With the introduction of the Regionalligas in 1994 and the 3. Liga in 2008 as the new third tier, below the 2. Bundesliga, all leagues below dropped one tier. With the establishment of the Regionalliga Bayern as the new fourth tier in Bavaria in 2012 the Bayernliga was split into a northern and a southern division, the number of Landesligas expanded from three to five and the Bezirksoberligas abolished. All leagues from the Bezirksligas onwards were elevated one tier.

↑ Promoted	↓ Relegated
