= SpVgg Stegaurach =

German football club

- Full name: Spiel-Vereinigung Stegaurach e.V. 1945
- Founded: 1945
- Ground: Aurachtalsportanlage
- Capacity: 3,500
- Chairman: Werner Waßmann
- Manager: Ismail Yilmaz
- League: Bezirksliga Oberfranken-West (VII)
- 2015–16: 10th
Home colours	Away colours

The SpVgg Stegaurach is a German association football club from the town of Stegaurach, Bavaria. Apart from football, the club also offers other sports like basketball and tennis.

The club's most notable achievement was its promotion to the tier four Fußball-Bayernliga in 1996, where it spent five seasons until 2001, with a second-place finish in 1999–2000 as its best result.

== History ==
The club, formed in 1945, played for the most part of its history as a lower division side, until 1991, when it earned promotion to the Bezirksliga Oberfranken-West, a league it previously had belonged to from 1966 to 1982. A league championship in its second year there took Stegaurach to the Bezirksoberliga for the first time in 1993.

In 1993–94, the club came third in the Bezirksoberliga Oberfranken, not usually a spot good enough for promotion, but because of the introduction of the new Regionalliga Süd (III), additional promotion spots were available that year. In its first season in the Landesliga Bayern-Nord (IV), the side came third, followed by a title in the following year, which entitled the club to promotion to the Bayernliga (IV).

Stegaurach adapted well to the Bayernliga, coming ninth in its first year. From there, the club improved season by season, finishing fifth, fourth and second in the following years. In the 2000–01 season however, the team's performance was abysmal, with the club coming last and being relegated from the Bayernliga again.

Back in the Landesliga, SpVgg found itself in immediate relegation trouble, to which it succumbed in the second year there. The club spent three seasons in the Bezirksoberliga Oberfranken again before another third-place finish allowed the side to move up once more.

Back in the Landesliga for two seasons, the club was unable to repeat its performance of the mid-1990s. Instead, it struggled against relegation again and was sent down to the Bezirksoberliga after two years in 2008. Stegaurach was handed straight through the league, coming 16th and last in 2008–09 and dropping to Bezirksliga level. After a 16-year absence, the club returned to the Bezirksliga Oberfranken-West, where it, for a time, struggled as a lower table side until winning the league championship in 2013 and won promotion back to the Landesliga. After two Landesliga seasons the club was relegated back to the Bezirksliga in 2015.

== Honours ==
The club's honours:

- Bayernliga
  - Runners-up: 2000
- Landesliga Bayern-Nord
  - Champions: 1996
- Bezirksliga Oberfranken-West
  - Champions: 1993, 2013
- Oberfranken Cup
  - Runners-up: 2000

== Recent seasons ==
The recent season-by-season performance of the club:

Season	Division	Tier	Position
1999–2000	Bayernliga	IV	2nd
2000–01	Bayernliga	IV	20th ↓
2001–02	Landesliga Bayern-Nord	V	13th
2002–03	Landesliga Bayern-Nord	V	16th ↓
2003–04	Bezirksoberliga Oberfranken	VI	7th
2004–05	Bezirksoberliga Oberfranken	VI	5th
2005–06	Bezirksoberliga Oberfranken	VI	3rd ↑
2006–07	Landesliga Bayern-Nord	V	13th
2007–08	Landesliga Bayern-Nord	V	18th ↓
2008–09	Bezirksoberliga Oberfranken	VII	16th ↓
2009–10	Bezirksliga Oberfranken-West	VIII	11th
2010–11	Bezirksliga Oberfranken-West	VIII	12th
2011–12	Bezirksliga Oberfranken-West	VIII	3rd
2012–13	Bezirksliga Oberfranken West	VII	1st ↑
2013–14	Landesliga Bayern-Nordwest	VI	12th
2014–15	Landesliga Bayern-Nordwest	VI	15th ↓
2015–16	Bezirksliga Oberfranken-West	VII	10th
2016–17	Bezirksliga Oberfranken-West	VII	

- With the introduction of the Bezirksoberligas in 1988 as the new fifth tier, below the Landesligas, all leagues below dropped one tier. With the introduction of the Regionalligas in 1994 and the 3. Liga in 2008 as the new third tier, below the 2. Bundesliga, all leagues below dropped one tier. With the establishment of the Regionalliga Bayern as the new fourth tier in Bavaria in 2012 the Bayernliga was split into a northern and a southern division, the number of Landesligas expanded from three to five and the Bezirksoberligas abolished. All leagues from the Bezirksligas onward were elevated one tier.

↑ Promoted	↓ Relegated
