= SpVgg Selbitz =

- Full name: Spielvereinigung Selbitz 1914 e.V.
- Founded: 1914
- Ground: Grüne Au
- Capacity: 4,000
- Chairman: Gerhard Färber
- Manager: Markus Häßler
- League: Landesliga Bayern-Nordost (VI)
- 2015–16: 7th
Home colours	Away colours

The SpVgg Selbitz is a German association football club from the town of Selbitz, Bavaria.

The club's greatest success came in 2012 when it qualified for the new northern division of the expanded Bayernliga, the fifth tier of the German football league system, where it played for two seasons until 2014.

== History ==
For most of its history the SpVgg Selbitz, formed in 1914, has been a non-descript amateur side in local Bavarian football. The club's rise through the divisions began in the late 1990s. In 2000 it earned promotion to the tier seven Bezirksliga Oberfranken-Ost where it finished runners-up in its first season there and won promotion to the Bezirksoberliga.

Playing in the Bezirksoberliga Oberfranken from 2001 to 2005 SpVgg Selbitz finished tenth in its first season, followed by a fifth place and another tenth. In its fourth and last season in the league the club won the competition and earned promotion to the Landesliga.

Selbitz played for the next seven seasons in the Landesliga Bayern-Nord until this league was disbanded in 2012. In this area the club also had its greatest success in the local cup competition, the Upper Franconia Cup, winning it in 2007 and 2008 and reaching the final in 2009, the last edition of the competition. The 2007 and 2008 titles qualified the team for the Bavarian Cup but it was unable to advance past the quarter finals. In the Landesliga the club finished four times in the top six in the seven seasons there, with a second place in 2011 as its best result. The later qualified the club to play in the promotion round to the Bayernliga where it was unsuccessful, missing out to TSV Gersthofen. A third-place finish the season after took SpVgg as far as the promotion round to the new Regionalliga Bayern, but in this competition it failed, too, losing to Würzburger FV. However, the third place was enough to qualify the club for the new northern division of the Bayernliga.

Selbitz played for two seasons in the Bayernliga Nord, coming eleventh in its first year. A fifteenth place in the second season meant the club had to defend its league place in the promotion/relegation round where it was unsuccessful and forced to step down to the Landesliga Bayern-Nordost.

== Stadium ==
The club plays its home games at the Grüne Au which holds up to 4,000 spectators. The official attendance record for the stadium is 3,200 which was achieved in a cup match against local rivals SpVgg Bayern Hof. The unofficial record is as high as 6,000, achieved in a friendly against 1. FC Nürnberg.

== Honours ==
The club's honours:

=== League ===
- Landesliga Bayern-Nord
  - Runners-up: 2011
- Landesliga Bayern-Nordost
  - Runners-up: 2015
- Bezirksoberliga Oberfranken
  - Champions: 2005
- Bezirksliga Oberfranken-Ost
  - Runners-up: 2001
- Kreisliga Hof
  - Runners-up: 2000

=== Cup ===
- Upper Franconia Cup
  - Winners: 2007, 2008
  - Runners-up: 2009

== Recent seasons ==
The recent season-by-season performance of the club:

Season	Division	Tier	Position
1999–2000	Kreisliga Hof	VIII	2nd ↑
2000–01	Bezirksliga Oberfranken-Ost	VII	2nd ↑
2001–02	Bezirksoberliga Oberfranken	VI	10th
2002–03	Bezirksoberliga Oberfranken	VI	5th
2003–04	Bezirksoberliga Oberfranken	VI	10th
2004–05	Bezirksoberliga Oberfranken	VI	1st ↑
2005–06	Landesliga Bayern-Nord	V	13th
2006–07	Landesliga Bayern-Nord	V	4th
2007–08	Landesliga Bayern-Nord	V	6th
2008–09	Landesliga Bayern-Nord	VI	13th
2009–10	Landesliga Bayern-Nord	VI	12th
2010–11	Landesliga Bayern-Nord	VI	2nd
2011–12	Landesliga Bayern-Nord	VI	3rd ↑
2012–13	Bayernliga Nord	V	11th
2013–14	Bayernliga Nord	V	15th ↓
2014–15	Landesliga Bayern-Nordost	VI	2nd
2015–16	Landesliga Bayern-Nordost	VI	7th
2016–17	Landesliga Bayern-Nordost	VI	

- With the introduction of the Bezirksoberligas in 1988 as the new fifth tier, below the Landesligas, all leagues below dropped one tier. With the introduction of the Regionalligas in 1994 and the 3. Liga in 2008 as the new third tier, below the 2. Bundesliga, all leagues below dropped one tier. With the establishment of the Regionalliga Bayern as the new fourth tier in Bavaria in 2012 the Bayernliga was split into a northern and a southern division, the number of Landesligas expanded from three to five and the Bezirksoberligas abolished. All leagues from the Bezirksligas onwards were elevated one tier.

=== Key ===
↑ Promoted	↓ Relegated
