= SC Weismain-Obermain =

German football club

SCW Obermain
- Full name: SCW Obermain 2004 e.V.
- Founded: 1922
- Ground: Waldstadion
- Capacity: 17,000
- League: Kreisliga Coburg 2 (IX)
Home colours	Away colours

The SC Weismain-Obermain is a German association football club from the city of Weismain, Bavaria.

Their greatest success came in 1996, when playing as SC Weismain they won the Bayernliga (IV) and were promoted to the tier three Regionalliga Süd. After three seasons of Regionalliga play, the club was relegated and suffered a sharp decline, followed by insolvency in 2004. The club was reformed as SC Weismain-Obermain.

== History ==
=== SC Weismain ===
The club was formed in 1922 as FC Weismain and changed its name to SC Weismain after World War II. For most of its history, it was unremarkable amateur side, beginning its ascent in 1982, with promotion to the local A-Klasse (VI) circuit. The season after that they won promotion to the Bezirksliga (V), followed by an advance to the Landesliga Bayern-Nord (IV) in 1985. For the next ten seasons here the club finished almost exclusively in the upper half of the table with a third-place result in 1987–88 being an early highlight.

With the establishment of the Regionalliga Süd (III) in 1994, the best clubs from the Bayernliga joined the new league, allowing in turn the best Landesliga clubs to become part of Oberliga play. The season after this, against lesser competition, Weismain won its division and earned promotion to the Bayernliga (IV) with the strong financial support of Alois Dechant, owner of a local construction company. He also had a large role in the expansion of the club's stadium to its present size.

Weismain had an impressive debut Bayernliga season, winning the league and advancing to the Regionalliga (III). In its first two seasons in here they finished mid-table, but their third season proved to be the end of the club's miracle as they finished 17th and fell back to Bayernliga play. The team collapsed in 1999–2000 and was relegated again. Alois Dechant and his company were suffering financially and eventually had to declare bankruptcy. The club had overspent and found itself in financial difficulty without the support of their backer.

A fifth-place finish in the Landesliga in 2001 was followed by relegation the next season, to the Bezirksoberliga Oberfranken. They bounced back on the field, but their financial problems again drove them from Landesliga play. Before the start of the 2004–05 Bezirksoberliga season, the club declared bankruptcy and was dissolved.

=== SC Weismain II ===
The club's reserve team, SC Weismain II, also achieved local success, rising as high as the Landesliga. They played there from 1997 to 2000, coming fourth in 1999. However, the side owns most of the negative records in this league as a result of a disastrous 1999–2000 season. Since the bankruptcy the club has not been able to field a reserve team.

=== SCW Obermain ===
A new club, SCW Obermain, under new leadership, but still playing in the same stadium. With insolvency, the club had lost all its players and was only able to field a team because the players of the over-40 side were willing to help out. The new squad took up play in A-Klasse Lichtenfels 2 (X), the lowest local football division. They made a slow recovery, winning their division in 2007 and so moving up to the Kreisklasse (IX) where the team played for the next couple of seasons. A runners-up spot in 2013 and two victories in the promotion round advanced the club to the Kreisliga (VIII) for the following season. The club finished runners-up in the league in 2015 but failed to win promotion.

== Honours ==
The club's honours:

=== League ===
- Bayernliga (IV)
  - Champions: 1996
- Landesliga Bayern-Nord (V)
  - Champions: 1995
- Bezirksoberliga Oberfranken (VI)
  - Champions: (2) 1997^{‡}, 2003
- Bezirksliga Oberfranken-West
  - Champions: 1995^{‡}
- ^{‡} Reserve team

== Recent seasons ==
The recent season-by-season performance of the club:

Season	Division	Tier	Position
1999–2000	Bayernliga	IV	17th ↓
2000–01	Landesliga Bayern-Nord	V	5th
2001–02	Landesliga Bayern-Nord	V	15th ↓
2002–03	Bezirksoberliga Oberfranken	VI	1st ↑
2003–04	Landesliga Bayern-Nord	V	18th ↓
2004–05	A-Klasse Lichtenfels 2	X	10th
2005–06	A-Klasse Lichtenfels 2	X	9th
2006–07	A-Klasse Lichtenfels 2	X	1st ↑
2007–08	Kreisklasse Coburg 2	IX	8th
2008–09	Kreisklasse Coburg 2	X	5th
2009–10	Kreisklasse Coburg 2	X	12th
2010–11	Kreisklasse Coburg 2	X	10th
2011–12	Kreisklasse Coburg 2	X	6th
2012–13	Kreisklasse Coburg 2	IX	2nd ↑
2013–14	Kreisliga Coburg	VIII	6th
2014–15	Kreisliga Coburg	VIII	2nd
2015–16	Kreisliga Coburg	VIII	5th
2016–17	Kreisliga Coburg	VIII	

- With the introduction of the Bezirksoberligas in 1988 as the new fifth tier, below the Landesligas, all leagues below dropped one tier. With the introduction of the Regionalligas in 1994 and the 3. Liga in 2008 as the new third tier, below the 2. Bundesliga, all leagues below dropped one tier. With the establishment of the Regionalliga Bayern as the new fourth tier in Bavaria in 2012 the Bayernliga was split into a northern and a southern division, the number of Landesligas expanded from three to five and the Bezirksoberligas abolished. All leagues from the Bezirksligas onward were elevated one tier.

↑ Promoted	↓ Relegated

== Stadium ==
The Waldstadion is still the club's home ground. Playing in the second-lowest tier of German football in 2008–09, the stadium's capacity of 17,000 far exceeds the needs of the club.

The record for spectators in the stadium was established in 1997, when 18,000 saw the game against 1. FC Nürnberg.
