= TSV Großbardorf =

German football club

- Full name: Turn- und Sportverein 1923 Grossbardorf e.V.
- Nickname: Gallier (Gauls)
- Founded: 1923
- Ground: Westphalen-Stadion
- Capacity: 3,500
- Chairman: Lothar Behr
- Manager: Robin Keiner
- League: Bayernliga Nord (V)
- 2025–26: Landesliga Bayern-Nordwest, 2nd of 18 (promoted)
Home colours	Away colours

TSV Großbardorf is a German association football club from the city of Großbardorf, Bavaria. The footballers are part of a 602 member sports club that also has departments for bowling and table tennis.

== History ==
Logo of TSV Großbardorf until 2013.

The club made its first appearance in the Landesliga Bayern-Nord (V) in 1993 where they became a competitive side after the turn of the millennium. Following a second-place result and a successful promotion playoff in 2003, Grossbardorf advanced to the Bayernliga (IV) where they played several seasons as a lower table side. They narrowly avoided relegation after a poor 15th-place finish in 2006–07.

The country's football competition was restructured in 2008 with the introduction of the new 3. Liga. TSV's performance markedly improved and they finished their 2007–08 campaign in fourth place, which advanced the side out of the now fifth tier Oberliga to the Regionalliga Süd (IV) for the 2008–09 season. Due to Regionalliga legislations on stadium size, TSV Großbardorf had to move to Willy-Sachs-Stadion in Schweinfurt for its home games.

They lasted only a single season at this level, returning to the Bayernliga for 2009–10. At the end of the 2011–12 campaign, TSV qualified for the promotion round to the new Regionalliga Bayern (IV), but was knocked out by BC Aichach in the first round. The league was split into northern and southern divisions and the club is now part of the former.

TSV Großbardorf finished third in the league in 2012–13 but qualified for the promotion round after second-placed Jahn Forchheim declined the opportunity. In the play-offs the team lost 8–4 on aggregate to Regionalliga side SpVgg Bayern Hof, mainly because of a humiliating 1–6 home defeat in the first leg. Before the start of the 2013–14 season the club unveiled a new logo and also announced that it had sold the naming rights to its stadium, renamed the Bioenergie-Arena. The current stadium name is Westphalen-Stadion.

== Honors ==
The club's honours:

=== League ===
- Bezirksoberliga Unterfranken (VI)
  - Champions: 1996–97
- Landesliga Bayern-Nord (V)
  - Runners-up: 2002–03

=== Cup ===
- Unterfranken Cup
  - Winner: 2000

== Recent managers ==
Recent managers of the club:

Manager	Start	Finish
Erwin Albert	1 July 1999	24 May 2007
Dieter Kurth	1 July 2007	30 June 2009
Wolfgang Schmitt	1 July 2009	24 April 2011
Hansjürgen Ragati	27 April 2011	30 June 2014
Dominik Schönhöfer	1 July 2014	Present

== Recent seasons ==
The recent season-by-season performance of the club:

Season	Division	Tier	Position
1999–2000	Landesliga Bayern-Nord	V	8th
2000–01	Landesliga Bayern-Nord	V	2nd
2001–02	Landesliga Bayern-Nord	V	3rd
2002–03	Landesliga Bayern-Nord	V	2nd ↑
2003–04	Bayernliga	IV	11th
2004–05	Bayernliga	IV	10th
2005–06	Bayernliga	IV	15th
2006–07	Bayernliga	IV	14th
2007–08	Bayernliga	IV	4th ↑
2008–09	Regionalliga Süd	IV	17th ↓
2009–10	Bayernliga	V	14th
2010–11	Bayernliga	V	10th
2011–12	Bayernliga	V	14th
2012–13	Bayernliga Nord	V	3rd
2013–14	Bayernliga Nord	V	6th
2014–15	Bayernliga Nord	V	5th
2015–16	Bayernliga Nord	V	4th
2016–17	Bayernliga Nord	V	4th
2017–18	Bayernliga Nord	V	8th
2018–19	Bayernliga Nord	V	

- With the introduction of the Bezirksoberligas in 1988 as the new fifth tier, below the Landesligas, all leagues below dropped one tier. With the introduction of the Regionalligas in 1994 and the 3. Liga in 2008 as the new third tier, below the 2. Bundesliga, all leagues below dropped one tier. With the establishment of the Regionalliga Bayern as the new fourth tier in Bavaria in 2012 the Bayernliga was split into a northern and a southern division, the number of Landesligas expanded from three to five and the Bezirksoberligas abolished. All leagues from the Bezirksligas onwards were elevated one tier.

↑ Promoted	↓ Relegated
