= Bezirksoberliga Oberfranken =

- Founded: 1988
- Folded: 2012
- Country: Germany
- State: Bavaria
- Level on pyramid: Level 7
- Promotion to: Landesliga Nord
- Relegation to: Bezirksliga Ost; Bezirksliga West
- Last champions: SV Friesen (2011–12)

The Bezirksoberliga Oberfranken was the seventh tier of the German football league system in the Bavarian Regierungsbezirk of Upper Franconia (German: Oberfranken). Until the introduction of the 3. Liga in 2008 it was the sixth tier of the league system, until the introduction of the Regionalligas in 1994 the fifth tier.

The league was disbanded at the end of the 2011–12 season, when major changes to the Bavarian football league system were carried out. Above the Bezirksoberligas, the Landesligas were expanded in number from three to five divisions and the Bezirke have two to three regional leagues, the Bezirksligas, as its highest level again, similar to the system in place until 1988.

== Overview ==
The Bezirksoberligas in Bavaria were introduced in 1988 to create a highest single-division playing level for each of the seven Bezirke.

Before the introduction of the Bezirksoberligas, the Bezirksliga was the level of play below the Landesliga. The Bezirksliga Oberfranken-Ost and Oberfranken-West fed the Landesliga Bayern-Nord as they afterwards fed the Bezirksoberliga Oberfranken.

The winner of the Bezirksoberliga Oberfranken, like the winner of the Bezirksoberliga Unterfranken, was directly promoted to the Landesliga Bayern-Nord. The two second placed teams out of those leagues played-off for another promotion spot. The winner went to Landesliga, the loser faced the 15th placed team out of the Landesliga for the last spot there. However, in some years additional promotion places were available in the Landesliga.

The three bottom teams of the Bezirksoberliga were relegated to the Bezirksliga, the team just above those faced a play-off against the second placed Bezirksliga teams.

With the league reform at the end of the 2011–12 season, which includes an expansion of the number of Landesligas from three to five, the Bezirksoberligas were disbanded. Instead, the Bezirksligas took the place of the Bezirksoberligas below the Landesligas once more.

The clubs from the Bezirksoberliga joined the following leagues:

- Champions : Promotion round to the Bayernliga, winners to the Bayernliga, losers to the Landesliga.
- Teams placed 2nd to 6th: Directly qualified to the Landesliga.
- Teams placed 7th to 13th: Three additional Landesliga places to be determined in a play-off round with the two Bezirksliga champions, losers enter Bezirksliga.
- Teams placed 14th to 16th: Directly relegated to Bezirksliga.

== Winners and runners-up ==
The following teams have won or finished runners-up in the league:

**Season**	**Champions**	**Runners-up**
1988–89	**TSV Hirschaid**	**SV Mitterteich** ^{+}
1989–90	**SC 08 Bamberg**	BSV 98 Bayreuth
1990–91	**ATS Kulmbach**	**FC Lichtenfels** ^{+}
1991–92	**VfB Coburg**	**1. FC Bamberg**
1992–93	**FC Strullendorf**	**FC Rodach**
1993–94	**FC Lichtenfels**	**FC Adler Weidhausen** ^{1}
1994–95	**FC Kronach**	1. FC Bamberg
1995–96	**ASV Gaustadt** ^{+}	**TSV Thiersheim** ^{+}
1996–97	**SC Weismain II**	**1. FC Bamberg**
1997–98	**ATS Kulmbach**	SV Mitterteich
1998–99	**SV Memmelsdorf**	FC Wacker Trailsdorf
1999–2000	**SV Mitterteich**	**SV Friesen**
2000–01	**FC Wacker Trailsdorf**	**TSV Thiersheim**
2001–02	**DVV Coburg**	**TSV Scheuerfeld**
2002–03	**SC Weismain**	**SV Friesen** ^{1}
2003–04	**SpVgg Bayreuth II**	**SV Pettstadt**
2004–05	**SpVgg Selbitz**	**TSV Mönchröden**
2005–06	**TSV Thiersheim**	**FC Strullendorf** ^{1}
2006–07	**SV Memmelsdorf**	**DVV Coburg**
2007–08	**1. FC Eintracht Bamberg II**	**ASV Hollfeld**
2008–09	**1. FC Trogen**	**TSV Neudrossenfeld**
2009–10	**DJK Don Bosco Bamberg**	**1. FC Burgkunstadt**
2010–11	**1. FC Trogen**	**SV Pettstadt**
2011–12	**SV Friesen**	**FC Vorwärts Röslau**

- Promoted teams in **bold**.
- ^{+} Teams finished on equal points, decider needed to determine final position.
- ^{1} The SpVgg Stegaurach (1994 and 2006) and the FC Bayern Hof II (2003) were promoted after finishing third in the league.

=== Multiple winners ===
The following clubs have won the league more than once:

**Club**	**Wins**	**Years**
1. FC Trogen	2	2009, 2011
SV Memmelsdorf	2	1999, 2007
DVV Coburg	2	1992, 2002
ATS Kulmbach	2	1991, 1998

== League placings ==
The final placings in the league since its interception:

Club	S	89	90	91	92	93	94	95	96	97	98	99	00	01	02	03	04	05	06	07	08	09	10	11	12
SpVgg Selbitz	4														10	5	10	1	L	L	L	L	L	L	L
SV Memmelsdorf	8	L	L	L	L	L	12	5	6	12	5	1	L	L	L	L	L	L	5	1	L	L	B	L	L
ASV Hollfeld	1																				2	L	L	L	L
TSV Neudrossenfeld	1																					2	L	L	L
DJK Don Bosco Bamberg	2																					4	1	L	L
1. FC Burgkunstadt	3																				4	3	2	L	L
1. FC Trogen	4																			7	3	1	L	1	L
SV Pettstadt	10						13	16			14						2	L	8	4	6	9	6	2	L
SV Friesen	6						15						2	L	4	2	L	L	L	L	L	L	L	9	1
FC Vorwärts Röslau	7																	10	10	8	7	15		7	2
FC Strullendorf	12			6	3	1	L	L	L	L	L	L	L	6	7	13	3	6	2	L	L	L	10	6	3
SV Mitterteich	10	2	L	L	L	L	7	6	11	6	2	5	1	L	L	L	L	L	L	L	L	L	L	8	4
BSC Saas Bayreuth	10	14															5	8	4	6	12	5	5	3	5
TSV Thiersheim	8								2	L	L	L	L	2	L	L	L	3	1	L	L	7	7	11	6
FSV Bayreuth ^{5}	3																						4	5	7
TSV Mönchröden	3																	2	L	L	L	L	L	10	8
SpVgg Lettenreuth	5																			9	13		9	13	9
DVV Coburg ^{2}	3														1	L	L	L	L	2	L	L	L	L	10
TBVfL Neustadt-Wildenheid ^{6}	2																							12	11
1. FC Redwitz	1																								12
SpVgg Germania Ebing	1																								13
SSV Kasendorf	11			7	11	7	11	9	16		10	9	7	16											14
1. FC Mitwitz	2																							14	15
SpVgg Bayreuth II	4			15													1	L	L	L	15				16
ASV Gaustadt ^{10}	12							4	1	L	12	12	16				13		9	12	9	13	3	4	
SG Regnitzlosau	5																			10	10	11	8	15	
TSV Meeder	2																						12	16	
FC Wacker Trailsdorf	10											2	4	1	L	10	8	11	14			12	11	17	
1. FC Eintracht Bamberg II ^{3}	1																				1	L	L		
TSV Hirschaid	9	1	L	13	16													7	6	3	8	6	13		
TSC Mainleus	5												13							5	5	10	14		
TV Selb-Plößberg	1																						15		
FC Türk Hof	3																				11	14	16		
ZV Thierstein ^{9}	1																					8			
SpVgg Stegaurach	5						3	L	L	B	B	B	B	B	L	L	7	5	3	L	L	16			
TV Ebern	5	5	9	14																14	14				
VfB Helmbrechts ^{1}	4	L	B	B	L	L	B	B	B	B								4	7	11	16				
TSV Konnersreuth	2																		13	13					
SpVgg Bayern Hof II ^{4}	4		12													3	L	12	12	15					
TSV Scheuerfeld	7												10	5	2	L	11	13	11	16					
1. FC Bamberg ^{3}	7	7	5	4	2	L	L	2	5	2	L	L	L	L	L	L	L	L	L						
TSV Bad Berneck	5														6	8	6	9	15						
SV Mistelgau	3	15					14												16						
TSV Trebgast	7	L	L	L	5	3	5	15								12	9	14							
SV Hallstadt	8	L	L	L	14							7	3	4	3	7	12	15							
SC Weismain ^{7}	1	L	L	L	L	L	L	L	B	R	R	R	B	L	L	1	L								
ATS Kulmbach ^{8}	12	L	6	1	L	9	9	8	10	3	1	L	L	8	8	4	4								
SV Steinwiesen	2															9	14								
ASV Marktschorgast	5												11	10	5	11	15								
FC Lichtenfels	11	3	3	2	L	4	1	L	L	L	L	4	5	3	9	6	16								
SV Würgau	6									7	11	13	12	14		14									
SC Reichmannsdorf	3													9	11	15									
FC Bad Rodach	7				4	2	L	L	L	L	3	3	14		12	16									
SpVgg Oberkotzau	7								8	5	4	6	9	7	13										
VfB Rehau	2													12	14										
SC Weidenberg	2													13	15										
SC Weismain II	4								3	1	L	L	L	11	16										
FC Gefrees	7						4	11	13	16		11	6	15											
FC Kronach	4	B	L	L	L	L	L	1	L	L	L	10	8	17											
FC Adler Weidhausen	5				6	8	2	L	L	L	L	8	15												
VfB Coburg ^{2}	7	L	13	9	1	L	L	L	4	11	9	14													
SpVgg Eicha	5							3	7	9	6	15													
SV Neuses	3									4	7	16													
1. FC Creußen	2										8	17													
SV Rothenkirchen	10	8	7	12	8	10	10	12	12	8	13														
FC Wacker Bamberg	1										15														
SV Weidenberg	4	10	15							10	16														
SC 08 Bamberg	2		1	L	B	B	L	L	L	13															
ATS Hof West	3	12	16							14															
SC Wacker Marktredwitz	2	L	L	L	L	L	L	L	9	15															
FSV Naila	4				12	11		7	14																
TSV Stadtsteinach	4					6	6	10	15																
SV Holenbrunn	1							13																	
BSV 98 Bayreuth ^{5}	7	11	2	3	10	5	8	14																	
VfR Johannisthal	1						16																		
DJK/Viktoria Coburg ^{2}	4		4	5	7	14																			
FC Münchberg	5	9	11	8	9	15																			
ASV Waldsassen	1					16																			
FC Ludwigschorgast	3		14	11	13																				
1. FC Falke Röbersdorf	4	6	8	10	15																				
TSV Schlüsselfeld	2	16		16																					
VfL Frohnlach II	2	4	10																						
1. FC Bayreuth ^{5}	1	13																							

=== Key ===
Color	Key
R	Regionalliga Süd
B	Bayernliga
L	Landesliga Nord
1, 2, 3, ...	Bezirksoberliga
1	League champions
	Played at a league level below this league

- S = No of seasons in league (as of 2011-12)

=== Notes ===
- ^{1} In 1997, the VfB Helmbrechts withdrew from the Bayernliga to the lower amateur leagues.
- ^{2} In 2000, VfB Coburg merged with local side DJK/Viktoria Coburg to form DVV Coburg. In 2011, the new club became insolvent.
- ^{3} In 2006, the 1. FC Bamberg merged with TSV Eintracht Bamberg to form 1. FC Eintracht Bamberg. The club became insolvent in 2010, folded, reformed as FC Eintracht Bamberg 2010 and continued playing in the Bayernliga. The reserve team however withdrew from the Landesliga.
- ^{4} In 2005, the FC Bayern Hof merged with SpVgg Hof to form SpVgg Bayern Hof.
- ^{5} In 2003, 1. FC Bayreuth and BSV 98 Bayreuth merged to form FSV Bayreuth.
- ^{6} In 2005, VfL Neustadt merged with TBV Wildenheid to form TBVfL Neustadt-Wildenheid.
- ^{7} In 2004, SC Weismain declared insolvency and withdrew from the league.
- ^{8} In 2004, ATS Kulmbach withdrew from the league.
- ^{9} In 2009, ZV Thierstein was demoted from the league for not fielding enough youth teams.
- ^{10} In 2011, ASV Gaustadt withdrew its team from the league to the A-Klasse.
