= 1. FC Bamberg =

German football club

- Full name: 1. Fußball-Club Bamberg 1901 e.V.
- Founded: 3 March 1901
- Ground: Hauptkampfbahn
- League: Merged
- Current name: FC Eintracht Bamberg
| Home colours | Away colours |

The 1. FC Bamberg was a German association football club from the town of Bamberg, Bavaria.

In 2006, the club merged with TSV Eintracht Bamberg to form 1. FC Eintracht Bamberg. 1. FC Eintracht went bankrupt in 2010 and a new club was formed, FC Eintracht Bamberg 2010.

1. FC had spent a number of seasons at top level in German football but, by the time of the merger, had fallen to an existence in the fifth and sixth division of German football. The new club briefly rose to tier-four Regionalliga Süd, dropped back to the Bayernliga before rising to the new Regionalliga Bayern again.

== History ==
=== 1901–45 ===
1. FC Bamberg, formed in 1901, made its first division debut in 1910, when it earned promotion to the Ostkreisliga, a statewide football league in Bavaria, where it played against the strongest Bavarian clubs at the time, 1. FC Nürnberg, FC Bayern Munich and SpVgg Fürth. 1. FC lasted for two seasons at this level, coming ninth in the league on both occasions and being relegated in 1912.

The club returned to the Bavarian first division, now renamed the Kreisliga Bayern and divided into a northern and a southern division, after the First World War, in 1919. After struggling for the first two seasons, it profited after 1921 from a further split of the league, now into four regional divisions, and came fourth in 1922 and 1923. Nevertheless, in 1923, when the league was renamed to Bezirksliga Bayern and reorganised into a single division once more, 1. FC did not qualify and was unable to return to top-level football for almost 20 years.

It was not until the Second World War that the club made a return to top-flight football, when it earned promotion to the northern division of the Gauliga Bayern, which had replaced the Bezirksliga in 1933. Bamberg had its greatest season in 1943–44, when it finished runners-up in its division, three points behind 1. FC Nuremberg. The following season was never completed because of the effects of the war.

=== 1945–63 ===
Post-war football saw the club being grouped in the second division Landesliga Bayern in 1945, a league the club won, earning promotion to the Oberliga Süd. The following season marked the team's last-ever in top-flight, coming 18th out of 20 clubs and being relegated once more in 1947. In the Landesliga, now sub-divided into two regional divisions, 1. FC won another championship but missed out on promotion when it lost to southern champions BC Augsburg, drawing at home and losing 1–4 in Augsburg. Bamberg won another title in the Landesliga in 1950, now in a single division again, but failed to gain promotion, missing out to Hesse champions SV Darmstadt 98. Instead, the side, along with four other Bavarian clubs, gained entry to the newly formed second division, the 2nd Oberliga Süd.

In the new league, Bamberg never performed particularly well, with the exception of 1952–53, when the side came third, four points behind a promotion rank. While it narrowly avoided relegation in 1955, the season after the side went down after coming last in the league. The club took out two division titles in the northern group of the Amateurliga Bayern in 1957 and 1958, followed up by Bavarian championship wins over southern division winners FC Penzberg and FC Wacker München. It remained winless in the promotion round to the 2nd Oberliga in 1957, when Amicitia Viernheim and Borussia Fulda were promoted instead, but was luckier the following year and earned promotion alongside VfB Friedberg from Hesse. The team lasted for two seasons in the second division and made a permanent farewell from the league in 1960, when it once more came last.

Bamberg remained a strong side in the Amateurliga, coming second and fifth in the years after relegation, with a final league title in 1963. It was unable however to crown the season with the Bavarian championship, missing out to TSV Straubing in three games. Additionally, because of the reorganisation of the German league system with the introduction of the Bundesliga, no promotion was available. For the club, it was the end of an era, it was never again able to repeat past performances.

In the era from 1961 to 1967, Bamberg's Dieter Zettelmaier was capped twenty times for the German amateur team, scoring 13 goals for the team. Zettelmaier, an outstanding goal scorer, was also top scorer of the Bayernliga from 1961 to 1963 and once more in 1966.

=== 1963–2006 ===
1. FC qualified to play in the new single division third tier Bayernliga, which was established in 1963, but results from now on were poor. In 1967, the club suffered relegation to the fourth division the Landesliga Bayern-Nord, and it took until 1975 to make a return to Bavaria's highest league. The club became a predominantly mid-table side in the Landesliga from then on. A brief stint in the Bayernliga in 1975–76 was followed by another five Landesliga seasons. Another title in this league, in 1981, however returned the side to the Bayernliga. It spent five seasons at this level, with a seventh place in the first one as its best result, but another relegation followed in 1986. The club was not to return to this level either after that.

Bambergs return to the Landesliga was an unlucky one, the club finished 15th and was relegated even further down, now to the Bezirksliga. Difficult years followed for the club, playing for a season in the Bezirksliga, gaining entry to the new Bezirksoberliga Oberfranken in 1988, and making a brief return for two seasons to the Landesliga from 1992 to 1994.

In 1997, the side finally made a permanent return to the Landesliga, which it would play in for the next nine seasons, until the merger. In this era, two second places, in 2004 and 2006, were its best result, the later allowing the club to earn promotion back to the Bayernliga through the promotion round, but then under a new name. The club's promotion-clinching 2–0 victory against Freier TuS Regensburg in Schwabach on 13 June was to become the side's last competitive game under the old name and identity.

The new club retained most of the old club's logo which depicts the Bamberg Horseman.

== Honours ==
The club's honours:

=== League ===
- Amateurliga Bayern (III)
  - Champions: 1946, 1948 (N), 1950, 1957 (N), 1958 (N), 1963 (N)
  - Runners-up: 1961 (N)
- Landesliga Bayern-Nord (IV)
  - Champions: 1975, 1981
  - Runners-up: 2004, 2006
- Bezirksoberliga Oberfranken (V-VI)
  - Runners-up: 1992, 1995, 1997
- (N) = Northern division

=== Cup ===
- Oberfranken Cup
  - Winners: 2002

=== Youth ===
- Bavarian Under 19 championship
  - Runners-up: 2006
- Bavarian Under 17 championship
  - Runners-up: 2004

== Final seasons ==
The final seasons' performances of the club since 1999:

| Year | Division | Tier | Position |
|---|---|---|---|
| 1999–2000 | Landesliga Bayern-Nord | V | 4th |
| 2000–01 | Landesliga Bayern-Nord | V | 6th |
| 2001–02 | Landesliga Bayern-Nord | V | 6th |
| 2002–03 | Landesliga Bayern-Nord | V | 4th |
| 2003–04 | Landesliga Bayern-Nord | V | 2nd |
| 2004–05 | Landesliga Bayern-Nord | V | 4th |
| 2005–06 | Landesliga Bayern-Nord | V | 2nd ↑ |

- With the introduction of the Bezirksoberligas in 1988 as the new fifth tier, below the Landesligas, all leagues below dropped one tier. With the introduction of the Regionalligas in 1994 and the 3. Liga in 2008 as the new third tier, below the 2. Bundesliga, all leagues below dropped one tier.

=== Key ===
| ↑ Promoted | ↓ Relegated |

== Basketball ==
The club operated a successful basketball department for many years before it became independent as what is now the Brose Baskets Bamberg. The team shared the football departments rivalry to local neighbour Bayreuth, in the form of SpVgg Bayreuth in football and BBC Bayreuth in basketball.
