= FC Kronach =

German football club

- Full name: 1. Fußball-Club Kronach 08 e.V.
- Founded: 5 April 1908
- Ground: Hammermühl-Stadion
- Capacity: 5,000
- Chairman: Alfred Sommer
- Manager: Heiko Melzer
- League: Kreisliga Coburg-Kronach (VIII)
- 2015–16: 8th
Home colours	Away colours

The FC Kronach is a German association football club from the town of Kronach, Bavaria.

The club's greatest success have been its three seasons spent in the Fußball-Bayernliga, in 1971–72 and again from 1987 to 1989.

== History ==
The club was formed on 5 April 1908. The club initially joined the leagues in neighbouring Thuringia due to the close proximity of Kronach to the border. After the First World War, the club started playing football in the Bavarian league system. In this era, the club managed a league championship in the A-Klasse Frankenwaldgau, which meant entitlement to enter the promotion round, where they were outplayed by clubs like FC Schweinfurt 05. After that, the club stagnated and was not particularly successful up until the mid-1960s.

The club first entered the tier-four Landesliga Bayern-Nord in 1967, a league formed four years earlier, and they were immediately competitive, finishing third in their first season there. After three seasons of upper table finishes, the side won the league in 1971 and earned promotion to the third division Bayernliga.

In the Bayernliga for the first time, in 1971–72, Kronach was struggling against relegation, eventually finishing 16th and three points from safety. Back in the Landesliga, FCK was not able to repeat past performances, coming eighth in their first year back and, after that, only achieving lower table finishes. Eventually, at the end of the 1977–78 season, the side was relegated back to the Bezirksliga.

Kronach spent the next six seasons at Bezirksliga level before once more making a return to the Landesliga. Again the club performed well as a newcomer, finishing fourth in their first two seasons back before they earned another league championship in 1987 and once more were promoted to the Bayernliga.

Back in Bavaria's highest league for a second stint, the club narrowly avoided relegation in their first year there, coming 13th and just a point clear of relegation. The following season, 1988–89, Kronach was only able to win three games and finished a distant last, 13 points clear of salvation.

In the Landesliga, the club achieved two good seasons after relegation, finishing fifth and sixth, but then declined and was relegated to the Bezirksoberliga Oberfranken in 1994. A league championship at this level however took the side straight back to the Landesliga. But overall, the club now entered an era of financial struggle, culminating in the necessity of having to sell its stadium to survive, which it since has been able to purchase back.

The team played three more seasons in the Landesliga from 1995 to 1998, followed by a permanent relegation from the league at the end of the 1997–98 season. FCK spent just as many seasons in the Bezirksoberliga from 1998 to 2001 before another relegation meant a permanent departure from this league, too. The club was handed straight through the Bezirksliga Oberfranken-West (VII) the following season and dropped down to the Kreisliga for the 2002–03 season.

The club played in the Bezirksliga once more in 2008–09 but came only 14th and was promptly relegated again. They made another return to the Bezirksliga in 2010 and were able to maintain the league this time round, playing in the league until 2014, when they were relegated again.

== Honours ==
The club's honours:

=== League ===
- Landesliga Bayern-Nord
  - Champions: 1971, 1987
- Bezirksoberliga Oberfranken
  - Champions: 1995
- Bezirksliga Oberfranken-West
  - Champions: 1967, 1984
- Kreisliga Coburg-Kronach
  - Champions: 2008, 2010
- A-Klasse Frankenwaldgau
  - Champions: 1925

== Recent seasons ==
The recent season-by-season performance of the club:

Season	Division	Tier	Position
1999–2000	Bezirksoberliga Oberfranken	VI	8th
2000–01	Bezirksoberliga Oberfranken	VI	17th ↓
2001–02	Bezirksliga Oberfranken-West	VII	17th ↓
2002–03	Kreisliga Kronach	VIII	
2003–04	Kreisliga Kronach	VIII	8th
2004–05	Kreisliga Kronach	VIII	6th
2005–06	Kreisliga Kronach	VIII	4th
2006–07	Kreisliga Kronach	VIII	2nd
2007–08	Kreisliga Coburg-Kronach	VIII	1st ↑
2008–09	Bezirksliga Oberfranken-West	VIII	14th ↓
2009–10	Kreisliga Coburg-Kronach	IX	1st ↑
2010–11	Bezirksliga Oberfranken-West	VIII	8th
2011–12	Bezirksliga Oberfranken-West	VIII	8th
2012–13	Bezirksliga Oberfranken West	VII	7th
2013–14	Bezirksliga Oberfranken West	VII	19th ↓
2014–15	Kreisliga Coburg-Kronach	VIII	4th
2015–16	Kreisliga Coburg-Kronach	VIII	8th
2016–17	Kreisliga Coburg-Kronach	VIII	

- With the introduction of the Bezirksoberligas in 1988 as the new fifth tier, below the Landesligas, all leagues below dropped one tier. With the introduction of the Regionalligas in 1994 and the 3. Liga in 2008 as the new third tier, below the 2. Bundesliga, all leagues below dropped one tier. With the establishment of the Regionalliga Bayern as the new fourth tier in Bavaria in 2012 the Bayernliga was split into a northern and a southern division, the number of Landesligas expanded from three to five and the Bezirksoberligas abolished. All leagues from the Bezirksligas onwards were elevated one tier.

↑ Promoted	↓ Relegated
