= TBVfL Neustadt-Wildenheid =

German football club

- Full name: TBVfL Neustadt-Wildenheid e.V.
- Nickname(s): Die Löwen (VfL)
- Founded: 30 May 2005
- Chairman: Michael Wagner
- League: Kreisliga Coburg (VIII)
- 2015–16: 14th
Home colours	Away colours

The TBVfL Neustadt-Wildenheid is a German association football club from the city of Neustadt bei Coburg, Bavaria.

The club is a merger of TBV Wildenheid and VfL 07 Neustadt. The latter achieved notability by playing in the 2nd Oberliga Süd from 1954 to 1963.

== History ==
While the TBV Wildenheid throughout its existence played as a lower amateur side, reaching the tier-four Landesliga Bayern-Nord for one season in 1968–69, the VfL Neustadt became quite a successful side during the 1950s and early 1960s. The club should not be mistaken with the VfL Neustadt/Weinstraße, a club from Rhineland-Palatinate.

=== VfL Neustadt ===
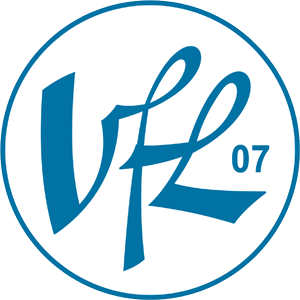
Logo of predecessor side VfL 07 Neustadt.

The VfL Neustadt was formed in 1907.

The club surfaced as a force in Bavarian football after the Second World War, earning promotion to the tier-two Landesliga Bayern (northern group) in 1946. It only lasted for two seasons at this level, in 1948, when the league was reduced to one single group it was relegated again.

The club made a return to Bavaria's highest league in 1950, winning the 2nd Amateurliga Oberfranken-Ost and coming second in the following promotion round. The Landesliga Bayern had been renamed to Amateurliga Bayern in 1950, along with the introduction of the 2nd Oberliga Süd as the new second division in Southern Germany. VfL took out the Amateurliga title in its first season there 1950–51 but failed in the promotion round to the 2nd Oberliga. Coming third on equal points with VfR Aalen and ASV Feudenheim, it lost 0–1 to the later in a decider.

The following season, VfL finished second in the league, one point behind champions FC Amberg. With Heinz Wittig, the club had a player selected for the German team that finished fourth at the 1952 Summer Olympics. After a seventh place in 1953, the league was once more divided into two regional groups, north and south and VfL became part of the northern group again. In 1953–54, it took out the title in this league. A Bavarian title game was not played and VfL advanced to the 2nd Oberliga promotion round. In this competition, the club came first and, alongside southern Bavarian champions SpVgg Weiden, won promotion to the second division.

VfL established itself as a mid-table side in its new league, staying out of relegation trouble. In its second season, 1955–56, the club set a home attendance record when 11,000 saw a 1–3 loss to FC Bayern Munich who would finish second in the league and earn promotion back to the Oberliga Süd.

In the 2nd Oberliga, considered a semi-professional league, VfL would pay its players DM 60 a month to play for the club. The rise of the club from the Easy German was made possible by employers like Siemens and local sponsors.

The 1957–58 season became the most successful for the club, finishing third and within four points of Oberliga promotion, which went to SV Waldhof Mannheim and TSG Ulm 1846. The next season was almost as successful, coming fourth but seven points clear of a promotion spot. After this, VfL declined somewhat.

In the 1959–60 season, the club finished twelfth and, to avoid relegation, Fritz Walter was hired temporarily as a coach. The club continued in the following year to struggle against the drop to the Amateurliga, with the gap to the relegation ranks getting smaller every season. In 1961–62, it saved itself by two points only.

Changes to the German league system in 1963, the introduction of the Fußball-Bundesliga and the Regionalligas below meant, VfL would have had to finish ninth or better to retain its second division status. This mark was missed by six points in twelfth place and the club had to return to the now single-division again Amateurliga Bayern.

Back in the third division, VfL finished sixth in its first year but then came only 16th in 1965 and was relegated to the tier-four Landesliga Bayern-Nord. It managed a second-place finish in this league in 1965–66 but then fell away to become a mid-table side until suffering another relegation, now to the Bezirksliga, in 1971. VfL immediately recovered and earned promotion back to the Landesliga, finishing fourth in this league in 1972–73. A period of upper-table finishes followed, culminating in a second place in 1978. From there, results declined and the club was relegated once more in 1981, never to return to this level of play.

Its glory years a thing of the past, the club played as a lower amateur side in the 1980s and 90s. In 1993, it made a return to the Bezirksliga, which was now the seventh tier, but lasted for only two seasons until 1995. It returned for another season in 1997–98.

=== Merger club ===
The new millennium saw VfL in desperate financial trouble with the real threat of having to declare insolvency. In 2003, it had to sell its stadium, the Stadion an der Sonneberger Straße, and clubhouse to SV Türk Gücü Neustadt to stay afloat. On 30 May 2005, the club had to merge with local amateur side TBV Wildenheid to survive, a step not universally accepted by all members, some of the older ones having left the club in protest. For a while after the merger, the club played under the name of Kickers Neustadt-Wildenheid, rising from the Kreisklasse back to the Bezirksliga.

The club played in the Bezirksliga Oberfanken-West (VIII) as a mid-table side in 2008–09, before winning the league the following year and earning promotion to the Bezirksoberliga Oberfranken.

At the end of the 2011–12 season the club dropped back to the Bezirksliga after finishing eleventh in the Bezirksoberliga but remained at the same tier as the Bezirksoberliga was disbanded. The club was relegated back to the Kreisliga at the end of the 2013–14 season.

== Honours ==
The club's honours:

=== League ===
- Amateurliga Bayern (III)
  - Champions: 1951
  - Runners-up: 1952
- Amateurliga Nordbayern (III)
  - Champions: 1954
- Landesliga Bayern-Nord
  - Runners-up: (2) 1966, 1978
- Bezirksliga Oberfranken-West (V-VIII)
  - Champions: (2) 1972, 2010

== Recent seasons ==
The recent season-by-season performance of the club:

Season	Division	Tier	Position
2004–05	Kreisklasse Coburg-Kronach 1	IX	1st ↑
2005–06	Kreisliga Coburg-Kronach	VIII	1st ↑
2006–07	Bezirksliga Oberfanken-West	VII	6th
2007–08	Bezirksliga Oberfanken-West	VII	10th
2008–09	Bezirksliga Oberfanken-West	VIII	10th
2009–10	Bezirksliga Oberfanken-West	VIII	1st ↑
2010–11	Bezirksoberliga Oberfranken	VII	12th
2011–12	Bezirksoberliga Oberfranken	VII	11th
2012–13	Bezirksliga Oberfanken-West	VII	14th
2013–14	Bezirksliga Oberfanken-West	VII	13th ↓
2014–15	Kreisliga Coburg	VIII	6th
2015–16	Kreisliga Coburg	VIII	14th
2016–17	Kreisliga Coburg	VIII	

- With the introduction of the Bezirksoberligas in 1988 as the new fifth tier, below the Landesligas, all leagues below dropped one tier. With the introduction of the Regionalligas in 1994 and the 3. Liga in 2008 as the new third tier, below the 2. Bundesliga, all leagues below dropped one tier. With the establishment of the Regionalliga Bayern as the new fourth tier in Bavaria in 2012 the Bayernliga was split into a northern and a southern division, the number of Landesligas expanded from three to five and the Bezirksoberligas abolished. All leagues from the Bezirksligas onwards were elevated one tier.

↑ Promoted	↓ Relegated
