= List of clubs in the Bayernliga =

This is a List of clubs in the Bayernliga, including all clubs and their final placings from 1945–46 to the current season. The league, commonly referred to as the Bayernliga, is the highest football league in the state of Bavaria (German: Bayern) and the Bavarian football league system. It is one of fourteen Oberligas in German football, the fifth tier of the German football league system. Until the introduction of the 3. Liga in 2008 it was the fourth tier of the league system, until the introduction of the Regionalligas in 1994 the third tier.

== Overview ==
The league's history however traces back to 1945, after the end of the Second World War, when it was formed under the name of Landesliga Bayern as a tier-two league with nine clubs in it. From 1946 to 1948, it was split into a northern and a southern group but than, from 1948, reunited once more. In 1951, it changed its name to Amateurliga Bayern and became a tier-three league following the formation of the 2. Oberliga Süd above it. Two years later, the league was once more divided into two regional division, which remained in place until 1963. With the inception of the Bundesliga in 1963, the Bayernliga returned to a single-division format and, in 1978, the league changed its name to Amateur-Oberliga-Bayern. In 1994, when the Regionalliga Süd was formed, the league changed its official name once more, now to Oberliga Bayern, and became a tier four league.

With the establishment of the Regionalliga Bayern in 2012, the league was split once more into a northern and a southern division.

Because the 2019–20 season was interrupted by the coronavirus disease 2019 (COVID-19) pandemic in Germany that broke out in March 2020, it was later suspended until 31 August, forcing a cancellation of the 2020–21 season as the Bavarian Football Association approved a resumption of the preceding one, which was curtailed in May 2021.

=== League timeline ===
The league went through the following timeline of name changes, format and position in the league system:

Years	Name		Tier	Promotion to
1945–46	Landesliga Bayern		II	Oberliga Süd
1946–48	Landesliga Südbayern	Landesliga Nordbayern	II	Oberliga Süd
1948–50	Landesliga Bayern		II	Oberliga Süd
1950–53	Amateurliga Bayern		III	2. Oberliga Süd
1953–63	Amateurliga Südbayern	Amateurliga Nordbayern	III	2. Oberliga Süd
1963–74	Amateurliga Bayern		III	Regionalliga Süd
1974–78	Amateurliga Bayern		III	2. Bundesliga Süd
1978–81	Amateur-Oberliga Bayern		III	2. Bundesliga Süd
1981–94	Amateur-Oberliga Bayern		III	2. Bundesliga
1994–2008	Oberliga Bayern		IV	Regionalliga Süd
2008–12	Oberliga Bayern		V	Regionalliga Süd
2012–	Bayernliga Süd	Bayernliga Nord	V	Regionalliga Bayern

== List of clubs ==
This is a complete list of clubs, as of the 2022–23 season, sorted by the last season a club played in the league:

Club	No	First	Last	Best	Titles	Seasons
TSV 1860 Rosenheim	15	1946–47	current	1st	1	**2011–12**
SpVgg Weiden^{9}	51	1946–47	current	1st	3	1953–54, **1964–65**, **2008–09**
ASV Cham	5	1949–50	current	5th	—	—
Würzburger FV	38	1950–51	current	2nd	—	—
TSV Kottern	16	1953–54	current	4th	—	—
FC Memmingen	43	1953–54	current	1st	1	**2009–10**
TSV Schwaben Augsburg^{7}	16	1958–59	current	1st	2	1958–59, **1959–60**
TSV 1860 Munich II	12	1959–60	current	1st	3	1960–61, **1996–97**, **2003–04**
Jahn Regensburg II^{3}	12	1962–63	current	3rd	—	—
ASV Neumarkt	18	1971–72	current	4th	—	—
FC Gundelfingen	6	1993–94	current	8th	—	—
1. SC Feucht	11	1997–98	current	1st	1	**2002–03**
TSV Landsberg	7	1997–98	current	8th	—	—
FC Ismaning^{8}	18	2000–01	current	1st	1	**2010–11**
TSV Großbardorf	17	2003–04	current	3rd	—	—
SpVgg Bayern Hof^{11}	12	2006–07	current	3rd	—	—
FC Eintracht Bamberg^{6}	7	2006–07	current	4th	—	—
FC Ingolstadt 04 II^{2}	5	2008–09	current	2nd	—	—
SV Schalding-Heining	3	2009–10	current	1st	1	2012–13
SC Eltersdorf	9	2011–12	current	1st	1	2019–21
DJK Ammerthal	8	2012–13	current	5th	—	—
DJK DB Bamberg	7	2012–13	current	6th	—	—
VfR Garching	3	2013–14	current	1st	1	2015–16
TSV 1865 Dachau	7	2014–15	current	5th	—	—
SV Erlbach	1	2015–16	current	17th	—	—
SV Kirchanschöring	5	2015–16	current	5th	—	—
DJK Gebenbach	4	2017–18	current	2nd	—	—
TSV Kornburg	1	2017–18	current	19th	—	—
TSV Abtswind	3	2018–19	current	9th	—	—
ATSV Erlangen	3	2018–19	current	3rd	—	—
TSV 1861 Nördlingen	2	2018–19	current	9th	—	—
Türkspor Augsburg	2	2019–21	current	8th	—	—
FC Deisenhofen	2	2019–21	current	2nd	—	—
SV Donaustauf	2	2019–21	current	2nd	—	—
VfB Hallbergmoos	1	2021–22	current	15th	—	—
1. FC Geesdorf	0+	2022–23	current	—	—	—
SpVgg Ansbach	14	1999–00	2021–22	1st	1	**2000–01**
1. FC Sand	9	2000–01	2021–22	7th	—	—
SV Seligenporten	7	2008–09	2021–22	1st	1	2015–16
SpVgg Hankofen-Hailing	9	2012–13	2021–22	1st	1	2021–22
TSV Schwabmünchen	9	2012–13	2021–22	4th	—	—
SV Pullach^{18}	8	2013–14	2021–22	1st	1	2016–17
DJK Vilzing	7	2014–15	2021–22	1st	1	2021–22
Vatan Spor Aschaffenburg	1	2021–22	2021–22	15th	—	—
TSV Karlburg	2	2019–21	2021–22	16th	—	—
TSV 1880 Wasserburg	2	2019–21	2021–22	3rd	—	—
FC Viktoria Kahl	2	1953–54	2019–21	15th	—	—
FC Pipinsried	5	2013–14	2019–21	1st	1	2019–21
Jahn Forchheim^{5}	12	1994–95	2018–19	2nd	—	—
FSV Erlangen-Bruck	9	2008–09	2018–19	5th	—	—
TSV Rain am Lech	8	2008–09	2018–19	1st	1	2014–15
TSV Aubstadt	7	2012–13	2018–19	1st	1	2018–19
FC Unterföhring	6	2012–13	2018–19	2nd	—	—
1. FC Sonthofen	8	2012–13	2018–19	4th	—	—
Würzburger Kickers II^{19}	3	2016–17	2018–19	9th	—	—
TuS Holzkirchen	2	2017–18	2018–19	12th	—	—
Türkgücü-Ataspor München	1	2018–19	2018–19	1st	1	2018–19
ASV Vach	1	2018–19	2018–19	15th	—	—
FC Amberg^{14}	30	1951–52	2017–18	1st	1	**1951–52**
BCF Wolfratshausen	7	2004–05	2017–18	7th	—	—
SV Heimstetten	7	2006–07	2017–18	1st	1	2017–18
SV Erlenbach	5	2013–14	2017–18	9th	—	—
Viktoria Aschaffenburg	3	2014–15	2017–18	1st	2	2014–15, 2017–18
SB Chiemgau Traunstein	1	2017–18	2017–18	15th	—	—
1. FC Schweinfurt 05 II	1	2017–18	2017–18	16th	—	—
VfL Frohnlach	26	1980–81	2016–17	3rd	—	—
Alemannia Haibach	6	1996–97	2016–17	6th	—	—
VfB Eichstätt	5	2012–13	2016–17	1st	1	2016–17
TSV Bogen	4	2013–14	2016–17	4th	—	—
ASV Burglengenfeld	1	2015–16	2015–16	15th	—	—
SpVgg Ruhmannsfelden	1	2015–16	2015–16	18th	—	—
SpVgg Landshut	28	1948–49	2014–15	1st	1	**1985–86**
SB/DJK Rosenheim	5	1978–79	2014–15	12th	—	—
SpVgg Unterhaching II	13	2001–02	2014–15	3rd	—	—
1. FC Bad Kötzting	7	2004–05	2014–15	5th	—	—
SV Memmelsdorf	4	2009–10	2014–15	9th	—	—
SV Raisting	2	2013–14	2014–15	11th	—	—
TSV Neudrossenfeld	1	2014–15	2014–15	17th	—	—
SpVgg Bayreuth	36	1954–55	2013–14	1st	8	**1958–59**, **1968–69**, **1970–71**, **1984–85**, **1986–87**, **2004–05**, **2007–08**, 2013–14
Wacker Burghausen II^{16}	4	2005–06	2013–14	2nd	—	—
BC Aichach^{16}	2	2012–13	2013–14	1st	1	2013–14
FC Affing	2	2012–13	2013–14	11th	—	—
SpVgg Selbitz	2	2012–13	2013–14	11th	—	—
ASV Hollfeld	2	2012–13	2013–14	14th	—	—
SpVgg GW Deggendorf^{15}	9	1953–54	2012–13	5th	—	—
TSV Gersthofen	8	1957–58	2012–13	6th	—	—
SC Fürstenfeldbruck	17	1971–72	2012–13	3rd	—	—
1. FC Schweinfurt 05	25	1976–77	2012–13	1st	3	**1989–90**, **1997–98**, 2012–13
TSV Aindling	17	1996–97	2012–13	2nd	—	—
1. FC Trogen	1	2012–13	2012–13	15th	—	—
TSV Kleinrinderfeld	1	2012–13	2012–13	18th	—	—
TSV Buchbach	4	2008–09	2011–12	4th	—	—
Freier TuS Regensburg	1	2010–11	2010–11	18th	—	—
TSG Thannhausen	3	2007–08	2009–10	7th	—	—
Würzburger Kickers	37	1945–46	2008–09	1st	1	**1976–77**
1. FC Nuremberg II	28	1955–56	2007–08	2nd	—	—
FC Kempten	11	1957–58	2007–08	5th	—	—
SpVgg Greuther Fürth II^{1}	7	2001–02	2007–08	2nd	—	—
Jahn Regensburg^{3}	22	1945–46	2006–07	1st	5	**1948–49**, **1966–67**, **1974–75**, **1999–00**, **2006–07**
1. FC Passau	22	1958–59	2005–06	4th	—	—
SG Quelle Fürth	7	1995–96	2005–06	2nd	—	—
FC Ingolstadt 04^{2}	2	2004–05	2005–06	1st	1	**2005–06**
SC 04 Schwabach^{10}	7	1998–99	2004–05	3rd	—	—
FC Bayern Hof^{11}	19	1946–47	2003–04	1st	1	1946–47
Falke Markt Schwaben	2	2001–02	2002–03	13th	—	—
TSV Gerbrunn	1	2002–03	2002–03	18th	—	—
FC Augsburg^{7}	19	1969–70	2001–02	1st	5	**1972–73**, **1979–80**, **1981–82**, **1993–94**, **2001–02**
MTV Ingolstadt^{2}	32	1946–47	2001–02	1st	1	**1980–81**
FC Starnberg^{4}	9	1992–93	2000–01	3rd	—	—
SV Lohhof	9	1990–91	2000–01	1st	1	**1998–99**
SpVgg Stegaurach	5	1996–97	2000–01	2nd	—	—
SC Weismain	2	1995–96	1999–00	1st	1	**1995–96**
SG Post/Süd Regensburg^{3}	3	1996–97	1998–99	3rd	—	—
VfB Helmbrechts	21	1947–48	1996–97	1st	1	1954–55
Türk Gücü München	6	1988–89	1995–96	6th	—	—
SV Heidingsfeld	4	1985–86	1994–95	7th	—	—
Wacker Burghausen	2	1993–94	1994–95	1st	1	**1994–95**
FC Enikon Augsburg	1	1994–95	1994–95	16th	—	—
SpVgg Fürth II^{1}	8	1948–49	1993–94	2nd	—	—
SpVgg Plattling	25	1950–51	1993–94	2nd	—	—
FC Bayern Munich II	32	1956–57	1993–94	2nd	—	—
SpVgg Unterhaching	11	1981–82	1993–94	1st	4	**1982–83**, **1987–88**, **1988–89**, **1991–92**
TSV Vestenbergsgreuth^{1}	7	1987–88	1993–94	2nd	—	—
TSV 1860 Munich	10	1982–83	1992–93	1st	3	**1983–84**, **1990–91**, **1992–93**
TSV Eching	5	1983–84	1992–93	6th	—	—
SC 08 Bamberg	2	1991–92	1992–93	14th	—	—
SpVgg Starnberg^{4}	1	1989–90	1989–90	13th	—	—
FC Wacker München	31	1945–46	1988–89	1st	6	**1946–47**, 1957–58, **1963–64**, **1969–70**, **1971–72**, **1975–76**
TSV Ampfing	10	1979–80	1988–89	3rd	—	—
FC Kronach	3	1971–72	1988–89	13th	—	—
TSV Großhadern	1	1986–87	1986–87	17th	—	—
ESV Ingolstadt^{2}	28	1945–46	1985–86	1st	4	1955–56, **1961–62**, **1967–68**, **1978–79**
1. FC Bamberg^{6}	20	1945–46	1985–86	1st	6	**1945–46**, 1947–48, **1949–50**, **1956–57**, **1957–58**, 1962–63
FC Vilshofen	6	1978–79	1984–85	9th	—	—
TSV Straubing	15	1946–47	1983–84	1st	1	**1962–63**
VfB Coburg^{13}	21	1952–53	1983–84	4th	—	—
ATS Kulmbach	18	1951–52	1981–82	1st	1	**1952–53**
1. FC Haßfurt	17	1957–58	1980–81	1st	2	**1960–61**, **1977–78**
FC Herzogenaurach	7	1970–71	1980–81	5th	—	—
TSV Trebgast	4	1977–78	1980–81	7th	—	—
VfR Neuburg	5	1975–76	1979–80	7th	—	—
SpVgg Büchenbach	22	1957–58	1978–79	1st	1	1961–62
TSV Hirschaid	1	1978–79	1978–79	18th	—	—
ASV Herzogenaurach	5	1972–73	1976–77	1st	1	**1973–74**
SpVgg Kaufbeuren	11	1958–59	1975–76	2nd	—	—
1. FC Bayreuth^{12}	16	1949–50	1974–75	2nd	—	—
BSC Sendling	6	1954–55	1973–74	8th	—	—
SpVgg Vohenstrauß	5	1969–70	1973–74	7th	—	—
TSV Roth	1	1973–74	1973–74	18th	—	—
FC Lichtenfels	27	1946–47	1972–73	1st	1	1959–60
SpVgg Helios München	17	1952–53	1971–72	3rd	—	—
BC Augsburg^{7}	5	1947–48	1968–69	1st	2	**1947–48**, **1965–66**
1. FC Schwandorf	13	1956–57	1968–69	7th	—	—
FC Münchberg	1	1968–69	1968–69	17th	—	—
ESV Nürnberg-West^{17}	6	1958–59	1967–68	2nd	—	—
SpVgg Hof^{11}	4	1955–56	1966–67	10th	—	—
ASV Zirndorf	4	1962–63	1965–66	2nd	—	—
VfL Neustadt	8	1946–47	1964–65	1st	2	**1950–51**, 1953–54
TSG Augsburg	9	1946–47	1964–65	3rd	—	—
TSV Johannis Nürnberg	4	1960–61	1963–64	5th	—	—
BC Augsburg II^{7}	2	1962–63	1963–64	6th	—	—
TSV 04 Schwabach^{10}	13	1946–47	1962–63	3rd	—	—
TSV Gochsheim	3	1947–48	1962–63	8th	—	—
FC Michelau	10	1953–54	1962–63	3rd	—	—
VfB Rehau	4	1959–60	1962–63	10th	—	—
ASV Süd Nürnberg	4	1959–60	1962–63	11th	—	—
FC Wacker Marktredwitz	2	1961–62	1962–63	4th	—	—
1. FC Hersbruck	2	1959–60	1961–62	14th	—	—
TSV Königsbrunn	1	1961–62	1961–62	17th	—	—
ASV Rimpar	1	1961–62	1961–62	15th	—	—
VfB Bayreuth^{12}	9	1952–53	1960–61	1st	1	**1955–56**
SpVgg Erlangen	6	1955–56	1960–61	6th	—	—
TuS Rosenberg	1	1960–61	1960–61	15th	—	—
SV Neuses	3	1957–58	1959–60	11th	—	—
SpVgg Fürth II^{1}	2	1958–59	1959–60	12th	—	—
SC 1906 München	2	1957–58	1958–59	12th	—	—
FC Penzberg	5	1953–54	1958–59	1st	2	1954–55, 1956–57
BSG Mitterteich	6	1953–54	1958–59	3rd	—	—
TSG Pasing	2	1957–58	1958–59	9th	—	—
SpVgg Niedernberg	1	1958–59	1958–59	16th	—	—
TuS Raubling	3	1954–55	1956–57	8th	—	—
SC Sylvia Ebersdorf	1	1956–57	1956–57	15th	—	—
FC Pressig	2	1954–55	1955–56	11th	—	—
ASV Dachau	1	1955–56	1955–56	12th	—	—
TS 1861 Regensburg	7	1947–48	1954–55	3rd	—	—
ATSV Erlangen	2	1953–54	1954–55	6th	—	—
FC Haidhof	8	1946–47	1953–54	5th	—	—
FC Stein	1	1953–54	1953–54	14th	—	—
FSV Gostenhof 83^{17}	3	1948–49	1951–52	9th	—	—
ASN Pfeil Nürnberg	6	1945–46	1951–52	6th	—	—
TSV Aubing	1	1951–52	1951–52	16th	—	—
1. FC Röthenbach	4	1947–48	1950–51	4th	—	—
FC Bayern Kitzingen	3	1946–47	1948–49	3rd	—	—
SC München-Süd	1	1947–48	1947–48	8th	—	—
SV 1911 Passau	2	1946–47	1947–48	7th	—	—
TG Viktoria Augsburg	1	1947–48	1947–48	11th	—	—
TSV Dingolfing	1	1947–48	1947–48	13th	—	—
TSV Gochsheim	1	1947–48	1947–48	8th	—	—
ASV Fürth	2	1946–47	1947–48	9th	—	—
FC Eintracht Nürnberg	3	1945–46	1947–48	4th	—	—
TSV Göggingen	1	1946–47	1946–47	10th	—	—
SC Bajuwaren München	2	1945–46	1946–47	5th	—	—
VfR Schweinfurt	2	1945–46	1946–47	4th	—	—

=== Key ===
Denotes club plays in a league above the Bayernliga in 2022–23.	Denotes club plays in the Bayernliga in 2022–23.	Denotes club plays in a league below the Bayernliga in 2022–23.

Club	Name of club
No	Number of seasons in league
First	First season in league
Last	Last season in league
Best	Best result in league
Titles	Number of league titles won
Seasons	Seasons league titles were won in (Bavarian championships in **bold**, division titles in italics)

=== Notes ===
- ^{1} TSV Vestenbergsgreuth merged with SpVgg Fürth in 1996 to form SpVgg Greuther Fürth.
- ^{2} FC Ingolstadt 04 is a merger of MTV Ingolstadt and ESV Ingolstadt in 2004.
- ^{3} SG Post/Süd Regensburg merged with Jahn Regensburg in 2002 and became Jahn Regensburg II. SSV Jahn Regensburg II was relegated in 2006 because the first team was relegated to the Bayernliga.
- ^{4} The football departments of SpVgg Starnberg merged with FT Starnberg 09 to form FC Starnberg in 1992. In 2001, FC Starnberg was dissolved and the football department re-joined FT Starnberg 09.
- ^{5} Jahn Forchheim withdrew from the league in 2000.
- ^{6} 1. FC Bamberg merged with TSV Eintracht Bamberg to form 1. FC Eintracht Bamberg. 1. FC Eintracht declared bankruptcy and folded in 2010. FC Eintracht Bamberg was formed immediately as its successor.
- ^{7} BC Augsburg merged with the football department of TSV Schwaben Augsburg in 1969 to form FC Augsburg. TSV Schwaben Augsburg shortly after reformed its football department.
- ^{8} In 2011, FC Ismaning declined promotion; runners-up FC Ingolstadt II promoted instead.
- ^{9} In 2011, SpVgg Weiden declared insolvency and withdrew from the Regionalliga.
- ^{10} TSV 04 Schwabach merged with 1. SC Schwabach in 1996 to form SC 04 Schwabach.
- ^{11} FC Bayern Hof merged with SpVgg Hof in 2005 to form SpVgg Bayern Hof.
- ^{12} In 2003, 1. FC Bayreuth and BSV 98 Bayreuth merged to form FSV Bayreuth. BSV 98 Bayreuth itself had been formed in a merger of VfB Bayreuth and TuSpo Bayreuth in 1968.
- ^{13} In 2000, VfB Coburg merged with DJK/Viktoria Coburg to form DVV Coburg. DVV Coburg was disbanded in June 2012 with a new club, FC Coburg, taking over its football teams and league place.
- ^{14} In 1995, 1. FC Amberg was declared bankrupt and folded. A new club, the FC Amberg, was formed, initially within the TV Amberg.
- ^{15} In 2003 SpVgg Grün-Weiss Deggendorf was formed through a merger of SpVgg Deggendorf and SV Grün-Weiss Deggendorf. Bayernliga seasons before the merger were played by SpVgg Deggendorf.
- ^{16} BC Aichach and Wacker Burghausen II withdrew from the Bayernliga after the end of the 2013–14 season.
- ^{17} FSV Gostenhof 83 and ESV Nürnberg-West merged in 1998 to form SG Nürnberg Fürth.
- ^{18} In 2017, SV Pullach declined promotion; runners-up FC Unterföhring promoted instead.
- ^{19} Würzburger Kickers withdrew their under-23 team from the league and closed it in 2019.

== Clubs and their placings ==
=== Landesliga Bayern 1945–50 ===
The complete list of clubs and placings in the Bayernliga while operating under the official name of Landesliga Bayern. From 1946 to 1948, the league operated in two regional divisions:

Club	46	47	48	49	50
BC Augsburg	OL	OL	1	OL	OL
SSV Jahn Regensburg	2	2	2	1	OL
SpVgg Fürth	OL	OL	OL	2	OL
1. FC Bamberg	1	OL	1	4	1
FC Bayern Hof		1	3	5	2
TSV Straubing		6	7	7	3
FC Wacker München	3	1	OL	6	4
ASV Cham					5
MTV Ingolstadt		4	4	8	6
SpVgg Weiden		7	6	9	7
VfL Ingolstadt	8	5	6	13	8
SpVgg Landshut				11	9
FC Lichtenfels		2	2	3	10
ASN Pfeil Nürnberg	6	6	11		11
1. FC Bayreuth					12
1. FC Röthenbach			4	12	13
FC Haidhof		9	5	10	14
FC Bayern Kitzingen		3	5	14	
FSV Gostenhof 83				15	
TS 1861 Regensburg			3	16	
SC München-Süd			8		
ASV Rosenheim		3	9		
SV 1911 Passau		7	10		
TG Viktoria Augsburg			11		
TSG Augsburg		8	12		
TSV Dingolfing			13		
TSV 04 Schwabach		5	7		
TSV Gochsheim			8		
ASV Fürth		9	9		
VfL Neustadt		8	10		
VfB Helmbrechts			12		
FC Eintracht Nürnberg	9	4	13		
TSV Göggingen		10			
SC Bajuwaren München	5	11			
Kickers Würzburg	7	10			
VfR Schweinfurt	4	11			

=== Amateurliga Bayern 1950–63 ===
The complete list of clubs and placings in the Bayernliga while operating under the official name of Amateurliga Bayern, before the introduction of the Bundesliga. From 1953 to 1963, the league operated in two regional divisions, south and north:

==== South ====
The Amateurliga Südayern and the southern clubs of the unified league, operating until 1953:

Club	51	52	53	54	55	56	57	58	59	60	61	62	63
TSV Schwaben Augsburg	OL	OL	2O	2O	OL	OL	OL	2O	1	1	2O	OL	OL
ESV Ingolstadt	4	6	8	2	2	1	3	8	10	16		1	2O
TSV Straubing	2O	2O	2O	2O	2O	2O	2O	2O	2O	2O	2O	4	1
FC Wacker München	2O	2O	2	2O	4	6	4	1	8	15			2
SpVgg Helios München			16	4	13				6	9	12	3	3
SpVgg Plattling	15		9	10	11	3	11	4	13	4	10	2	4
ASV Cham	2O	2O	2O	2O	2O	2O	2O	2O	2O	2O	2O	2O	5
BC Augsburg Amateure													6
1. FC Schwandorf							10	5	4	10	8	9	7
SpVgg Kaufbeuren									2	7	4	10	8
SpVgg Weiden	14	10	5	1	2O	5	9	3	3	5	3	6	9
SpVgg Landshut	5	14	18	14							9	8	10
TSV Kottern				6	9	7	8	13	17		11	13	11
FC Kempten								6	9	8	7	11	12
SSV Jahn Regensburg Amateure													13
FC Bayern Munich Amateure							7	2	7	11	2	12	14
TSV 1860 Munich Amateurs										2	1	14	15
1. FC Amberg		1	15	5	10	2	2	11	5	3	5	5	16
TSV Gersthofen								10	11	13	6	7	17
SpVgg Deggendorf				11	5	9	6	14		6	13	15	
1. FC Passau									12	14		16	
TSV Königsbrunn												17	
TSV 1860 Rosenheim											14		
TuS Rosenberg											15		
FC Memmingen				15		4	4	15		12	16		
SC 1906 München								12	14				
FC Penzberg				7	1	2O	1	7	15				
BSG Mitterteich				3	6	3	11	10	15				
TSG Pasing								9	16				
BSC Sendling					12	8	12	16					
MTV Ingolstadt	11	15		9	7	11	13						
TuS Raubling					8	10	14						
ASV Dachau						12							
TSG Augsburg	13	9	14	8	3	13							
TS 1861 Regensburg	12	11	19	12	14								
FC Haidhof	7	8	11	13									
TSV Aubing		16											

==== North ====
The Amateurliga Nordayern and the northern clubs of the unified league, operating until 1953:

Club	51	52	53	54	55	56	57	58	59	60	61	62	63
VfL Neustadt	1	2	7	1	2O	2O	2O	2O	2O	2O	2O	2O	2O
VfB Helmbrechts				7	1	2O	2O	2O	2O	2O	2O	2O	2O
1. FC Haßfurt								15		5	1	2O	2O
1. FC Bamberg	2O	2O	2O	2O	2O	2O	1	1	2O	2O	2	5	1
ASV Zirndorf													2
Kickers Würzburg	6	4	3	9	2	11	7	6	6	2	4	7	3
SpVgg Bayreuth					4	8	3	2	1	2O	2O	2O	4
TSV Johannis Nürnberg											6	9	5
FC Lichtenfels	3	7	6	2	8	2	2	5	5	1	9	11	6
SpVgg Büchenbach								13	8	9	5	1	7
1. FC Bayreuth	2	12	4	10	10	14			2	3	15		8
ESV Nürnberg-West									13	7	8	2	9
ATS Kulmbach		13	1	4	6	9	10	14			3	6	10
TSV 04 Schwabach		3	12	8	13		5	7	10	8	13	10	11
FC Michelau				12	3	4	8	3	9	4	10	8	12
FC Wacker Marktredwitz												4	13
FV Würzburg 04	8	5	17	11	9	7	14				11	3	14
VfB Rehau										10	14	12	15
ASV Süd Nürnberg										11	12	13	16
TSV Gochsheim				13									17
VfB Coburg			10	5	5	5	9	4	4	6	7	14	
ASV Rimpar												15	
1. FC Hersbruck										14		16	
VfB Bayreuth			13	3	7	1	4	9	3	12	16		
SpVgg Erlangen						12	6	12	7	13	17		
SV Neuses								11	11	15			
SpVgg Fürth Amateure									12	16			
1. FC Nuremberg Amateure						6	13	8	14				
BSG Mitterteich				3	6	3	11	10	15				
SpVgg Niedernberg									16				
SpVgg Hof						10	12	16					
SC Sylvia Ebersdorf							15						
FC Pressig					11	13							
ATSV Erlangen				6	12								
FC Stein				14									
FC Viktoria Kahl				15									
FSV Gostenhof	9	17											
ASN Pfeil Nürnberg	10	18											
1. FC Röthenbach	16												

=== Amateurliga Bayern 1963–1978 ===
The complete list of clubs and placings in the Bayernliga while operating under the official name of Amateurliga Bayern:

Club	64	65	66	67	68	69	70	71	72	73	74	75	76	77	78
SpVgg Bayreuth	5	3	11	8	5	1	RL	1	RL	RL	RL	2B	2B	2B	2B
FC Augsburg ^{7}	RL	2	1	RL	16	2	4	3	8	1	RL	2B	2B	2B	2B
FV Würzburg 04		13	18					8	14	4	10	2	2	2B	2B
Kickers Würzburg	12	4	3	12	10	12	11	6	5	15	8	6	3	1	2B
1. FC Haßfurt	3	10	5	6	13	3	9	14	17					8	1
MTV Ingolstadt				16			5	4	3	6	9	13	17		2
ESV Ingolstadt	RL	RL	RL	2	1	RL	RL	RL	RL	2	3	9	9	6	3
FC Bayern Munich Amateure					4	11	12	17			13	5	11	4	4
FC Wacker München	1	RL	13	4	2	8	1	RL	1	RL	2	3	1	5	5
ATS Kulmbach												7	6	2	6
TSV Trebgast															7
1. FC Schweinfurt 05	RL	RL	RL	RL	RL	RL	RL	RL	RL	RL	RL	2B	2B	14	8
ASV Neumarkt									4	16		8	4	12	9
FC Memmingen								9	9	11	12	14	12	10	10
1. FC Amberg													5	3	11
TSV 1860 Rosenheim														11	12
SpVgg Büchenbach	13	14	6	7	9	6	3	7	11	5	6	10	10	13	13
VfR Neuburg													15	7	14
1. FC Herzogenaurach								5	7	12	17				15
SpVgg Plattling	14	15	15	19										9	16
SSV Jahn Regensburg	2	17		1	RL	RL	RL	RL	RL	RL	RL	1	2B	2B	17
VfB Coburg					8	5	8	18			7	16	13	15	18
SC Fürstenfeldbruck									6	9	5	11	7	16	
ASV Herzogenaurach										3	1	4	14	17	
1. FC Passau						7	10	13	10	10	4	12	8	18	
1. FC Bamberg	11	9	9	15	7								16		
SpVgg Kaufbeuren			8	17		13	18					15	18		
SpVgg Weiden		1	RL	3	6	9	6	2	2	13	14	17			
1. FC Bayreuth			17				17			7	11	18			
SpVgg Vohenstrauß							7	11	12	8	15				
BSC Sendling										14	16				
TSV Roth											18				
FC Lichtenfels	8	8	4	11	12	4	2	10	13	17					
1. FC Nuremberg Amateure			2	5	7	10	13	12	15	18					
FC Kronach									16						
SpVgg Helios München	10	6	10	10	11	14	15	15	18						
VfB Helmbrechts	4	7	12	14	15	15	14	16							
TSV Straubing	15	5	7	9	3	16	16								
FC Münchberg						17									
1. FC Schwandorf	9	11	14	13	14	18									
ESV Nürnberg-West					18										
SpVgg Hof				18											
ASV Zirndorf	7	12	16												
VfL Neustadt	6	16													
TSG Augsburg		18													
TSV Johannis Nürnberg	16														
BC Augsburg	17														
ASV Cham	18														

=== Amateur-Oberliga Bayern 1978–1994 ===
The complete list of clubs and placings in the Bayernliga while operating under the official name of Amateur-Oberliga Bayern:

Club	79	80	81	82	83	84	85	86	87	88	89	90	91	92	93	94
TSV 1860 Munich	2B	B	B	2B	6	1	11	2	3	3	5	2	1	2B	1	2B
FC Augsburg	2B	1	2B	1	2B	7	2	3	6	6	4	3	8	4	6	1
SV Lohhof													9	13	3	2
SpVgg Unterhaching				5	1	3	5	8	4	1	1	2B	2	1	2B	3
FC Bayern Munich Amateure	4	9	9	14	2	2	4	9	2	7	8	12	4	6	5	4
SpVgg Landshut					15	6	9	1	11	11	15				12	5
SpVgg Fürth ^{1}	2B	2B	2B	2B	2B	5	6	4	18					3	2	6
Wacker Burghausen																7
TSV Vestenbergsgreuth ^{1}										2	3	4	10	2	4	8
1. FC Schweinfurt 05	3	4	4	2	16		18		14	10	2	1	2B	7	9	9
1. FC Passau															10	10
FC Starnberg ^{4}															8	11
SpVgg Bayreuth	2B	2B	2B	2B	3	4	1	2B	1	2B	2B	2B	14	9	13	12
FC Memmingen	15	3	11	10	14	14	13	14	15			9	7	11	7	13
VfB Helmbrechts		10	10	6	18							10	16			14
FC Gundelfingen																15
Jahn Regensburg ^{3}						8	12	5	13	14			11	5	11	16
SpVgg Plattling								11	5	16		11	13	17		17
VfL Frohnlach			6	11	12	9	7	10	9	5	11	16			14	
TSV Eching						16		18					6	10	15	
SpVgg Weiden								13	16		9	5	3	8	16	
SC 08 Bamberg														13	17	
Türk Gücü München											6	7	12	14		
TSV Schwaben Augsburg				12	8	20					12	14		15		
MTV Ingolstadt ^{2}	2B	2B	1	4	4	10	15			4	10	6	5	16		
1. FC Amberg	2	8	8	17					8	12	7	8	15			
Kickers Würzburg	13	14	5	3	19								17			
SpVgg Starnberg ^{4}												13				
FC Bayern Hof	6	18				17					13	15				
TSV Ampfing		12	7	8	13	15	3	6	10	9	14					
FC Wacker München	7	15			5	11	16			8	16					
FC Kronach										13	17					
SV Heidingsfeld								15	7	15						
SC Fürstenfeldbruck			3	15				7	12	17						
TSV Großhadern									17							
1. FC Nuremberg Amateure			2	13	17		10	12	19							
ESV Ingolstadt ^{2}	1	2B	2B	20			8	16								
1. FC Bamberg ^{6}				7	11	12	14	17								
FC Vilshofen	14	16		9	9	13	17									
TSV Straubing					7	18										
VfB Coburg					10	19										
TSV 1860 Rosenheim	10	13	14	16												
ATS Kulmbach	5	5	13	18												
ASV Neumarkt	11	6	12	19												
TSV Trebgast	8	11	15													
FC Herzogenaurach		7	16													
1. FC Haßfurt	9	2	17													
Würzburger FV 04	2B	2B	18													
VfR Neuburg	12	17														
SpVgg Büchenbach	16															
SB/DJK Rosenheim	17															
TSV Hirschaid	18															

=== Oberliga Bayern 1994–2012 ===
The complete list of clubs and placings in the Bayernliga while operating under the official name of Oberliga Bayern:

Club	95	96	97	98	99	00	01	02	03	04	05	06	07	08	09	10	11	12
FC Augsburg	R	R	R	R	R	R	4	1	R	R	R	R	2B	2B	2B	2B	2B	B
FC Ingolstadt 04 ^{2}											2	1	R	R	2B	3L	2B	2B
Wacker Burghausen	1	R	R	R	R	R	R	R	2B	2B	2B	2B	2B	R	3L	3L	3L	3L
Jahn Regensburg ^{3}	8	18				1	R	R	R	2B	R	R	1	R	3L	3L	3L	3L
TSV 1860 Munich II			1	R	R	R	R	2	2	1	R	R	R	R	R	R	R	R
SpVgg Greuther Fürth II								5	9	4	12	4	2	2	R	R	R	R
1. FC Nuremberg II					7	5	2	3	6	2	4	2	6	3	R	R	R	R
FC Memmingen	12	11	2	15	8	12	10	18		10	9	12	4	6	3	1	R	R
FC Ingolstadt 04 II ^{8}															6	7	2	R
TSV 1860 Rosenheim		16		17												12	3	1
SpVgg Bayern Hof	14	4	11	10	14	4	14	4	12	17			12	15	10	10	15	2
SC Eltersdorf																		3
TSV Buchbach															8	11	4	4
TSV Rain am Lech															14	5	12	5
SV Seligenporten															15	6	6	6
VfL Frohnlach	13	3	4	8	18						11	7	16		7	16		7
1. FC Eintracht Bamberg ^{6}													5	5	R	R	8	8
FC Ismaning ^{8}							8	11	3	3	3	6	14	10	11	2	1	9
TSV Grossbardorf										11	10	14	15	4	R	14	10	10
FSV Erlangen-Bruck															5	8	11	11
Würzburger FV 04						13	13	15		16		3	9	14	16		5	12
1. FC Schweinfurt 05	5	3	5	1	R	R	R	2B	R	R	19			16	17		9	13
SB/DJK Rosenheim																		14
SV Heimstetten													10	17			14	15
TSV Aindling			13	13	11	7	7	9	7	12	14	8	7	12	2	4	13	16
TSV Gersthofen																		17
SpVgg Unterhaching II								6	8	5	7	10	13	9	R	3	7	18
SpVgg Weiden ^{9}		6	8	12	5	6	3	12	10	13	17		8	8	1	R	R	
SpVgg Bayreuth	2	10	15		17			7	4	7	1	R	3	1	4	9	16	
SV Schalding-Heining																13	17	
Freier TuS Regensburg																	18	
SpVgg Ansbach						10	1	R	13	14	15			13	12	15		
SV Memmelsdorf																17		
TSG Thannhausen														7	9	18		
1. FC Bad Kötzting											6	5	11	11	13	19		
Kickers Würzburg				16											18			
FC Kempten						15	16					16		18				
SC Fürstenfeldbruck									5	6	5	9	17					
Wacker Burghausen II												13	18					
1. SC Feucht				14	9	3	5	14	1	R	R	15	19					
Jahn Regensburg II ^{3}									11	8	8	11						
SG Quelle Fürth		2	R	2	2	R	9	8	15			17						
1. FC Passau	13	12	12	6	13	18				15	13	18						
SC 04 Schwabach					3	9	12	10	14	9	16							
BCF Wolfratshausen											18							
SpVgg Landshut	7	14	10	9	10	16				18								
TSV Schwaben Augsburg					14	15	17		16									
Falke Markt Schwaben								13	17									
TSV Gerbrunn									18									
1. FC Sand							11	16										
MTV Ingolstadt ^{2}	18						6	17										
ASV Neumarkt							15	19										
SV Lohhof	R	7	14	7	1	R	18											
FT Starnberg 09 ^{4}	3	5	3	11	12	11	19											
SpVgg Stegaurach			9	5	4	2	20											
Jahn Forchheim ^{5}	9	9	7	4	6	8												
SC Weismain		1	R	R	R	17												
SG Post/Süd Regensburg ^{3}			6	3	16													
TSV Landsberg				18														
FC Gundelfingen	11	8	16															
Alemannia Haibach			17															
VfB Helmbrechts	10	15	18															
Türk Gücü München	6	17																
1. FC Amberg	15																	
FC Enikon Augsburg	16																	
SV Heidingsfeld	17																	

=== Bayern Nord 2012–present ===
The complete list of clubs and placings in the Bayernliga Nord since the league was sub-divided into two divisions:

Club	13	14	15	16	17	18	19	20	21	22	23
1. FC Schweinfurt 05	1	R	R	R	R	R	R	R	R	R	R
SpVgg Bayreuth	6	1	R	R	R	R	R	R	R	R	3L
VfB Eichstätt	9	4	13	2	1	R	R	R	R	R	R
Viktoria Aschaffenburg	R	R	1	R	2	1	R	R	R	R	R
TSV Aubstadt	8	2	9	8	3	2	1	R	R	R	R
SC Eltersdorf	R	8	7	7	6	4	6	2	1	R	x
DJK Vilzing			5	12	6	7	5	1	2	1	R
SpVgg Ansbach			15		13	7	11	10	6	2	R
SV Donaustauf								11	11	2	x
ATSV Erlangen							13	7	10	3	x
FC Eintracht Bamberg	R	R	R	18				6	8	4	x
SSV Jahn Regensburg II	5	7	6	13	16		3	15	12	4	x
ASV Neumarkt	12	17			5	8	18			5	x
DJK Don Bosco Bamberg	16			11	11	13	8	13	14	6	x
DJK Gebenbach						5	2	11	9	7	x
DJK Ammerthal	7	12	14		8	12	12	5	5	8	x
TSV Abtswind							10	14	12	9	x
1. SC Feucht				10	15					10	x
TSV Großbardorf	3	6	5	4	4	8	4	4	4	11	x
SpVgg Bayern Hof	R	R	8	3	R	10	7	12	13	12	x
ASV Cham								9	11	13	x
Würzburger FV	5	10	11	12	12	3	3	8	7	14	x
Vatan Spor Aschaffenburg										15	
TSV Karlburg								16	16	16	
SV Seligenporten	R	R	R	1	R	R	5	3	3	17	
1. FC Sand	17			9	7	15	14	15	15	18	
1. FC Geesdorf											x
FC Viktoria Kahl								17	17		
Würzburger Kickers II					9	11	9				
ASV Vach							15				
FSV Erlangen-Bruck	13	14	16			9	16				
SpVgg Jahn Forchheim	2	3	3	16		6	17				
SpVgg SV Weiden		5	4	5	14	14					x
1. FC Schweinfurt 05 II						16					
SV Erlenbach		9	10	14	16	17					
FC Amberg	4	4	2	R	10	18					
TSV Kornburg						19					x
Alemannia Haibach	10	16	12	6	17						
VfL Frohnlach	R	11	13	17	18						
ASV Burglengenfeld				15							
TSV Neudrossenfeld			17								
SV Memmelsdorf	9	13	18								
SpVgg Selbitz	11	15									
ASV Hollfeld	14	18									
1. FC Trogen	15										
TSV Kleinrinderfeld	18										

=== Bayern Süd 2012–present ===
The complete list of clubs and placings in the Bayernliga Süd since the league was sub-divided into two divisions:

Club	13	14	15	16	17	18	19	20	21	22	23
FC Memmingen	R	R	R	R	R	R	R	R	R	R	x
SV Schalding-Heining	1	R	R	R	R	R	R	R	R	R	x
TSV 1860 Rosenheim	R	R	10	3	R	R	R	R	R	R	R
VfB Eichstätt	9	4	13	2	1	R	R	R	R	R	R
SV Heimstetten	R	R	R	6	7	1	R	R	R	R	R
Türkgücü-Ataspor München							1	R	3L	3L	R
TSV Rain am Lech	R	R	1	R	10	3	2	R	R	R	R
FC Pipinsried		3	3	10	3	R	R	1	1	R	R
SpVgg Hankofen-Hailing	10	7	6	9	13	13	13	14	14	1	R
DJK Vilzing			5	12	6	7	5	1	2	1	R
SV Donaustauf								11	11	2	x
FC Ingolstadt 04 II	R	R	R	R	R	R	R	4	4	3	x
SSV Jahn Regensburg II	5	7	6	13	16		3	15	12	4	x
SV Kirchanschöring				7	8	16	11	8	9	5	x
FC Ismaning	R	18			11	11	15	9	10	6	x
TSV 1860 Munich II	R	R	R	R	R	14	10	7	7	7	x
TSV Schwaben Augsburg						5	12	17	17	8	x
TSV Landsberg			8	15	15	18		13	15	9	x
FC Deisenhofen								3	2	10	x
VfR Garching		2	R	1	R	R	R	R	R	11	x
TSV Kottern	18			11	12	4	7	6	5	12	x
FC Gundelfingen					18					13	x
Türkspor Augsburg								12	8	14	x
VfB Hallbergmoos										15	x
SV Pullach		5	2	2	1	2	4	16	16	16	
TSV Dachau			12	8	5	10	6	10	13	17	x
TSV 1880 Wasserburg								2	3	18	
TSV Schwabmünchen	14	8	14	14	4	6	8	5	6	19	
TSV 1861 Nördlingen							9	18	18		x
1. FC Sonthofen	8	12	11	4	9	9	14				
FC Unterföhring	7	10	9	5	2	R	16				
TuS Holzkirchen						12	17				
ASV Neumarkt	12	17			5	8	18			5	x
SB Chiemgau Traunstein						15					
BCF Wolfratshausen	13	16	7	13	14	17					
TSV Kornburg						19					x
TSV Bogen		6	4	16	17						
SV Erlbach				17							x
SpVgg Ruhmannsfelden				18							
1. FC Bad Kötzting			15								
SpVgg Landshut	4	14	16								
SV Raisting		11	17								
SB/DJK Rosenheim	12	13	18								
SpVgg Unterhaching II	6	9	19								
BC Aichach	3	1									
SV Wacker Burghausen II	2	15									
FC Affing	11	17									
TSV Aindling	15										
SpVgg GW Deggendorf	16										
TSV Gersthofen	17										
SC Fürstenfeldbruck	19										

- Placings for 2020 were based on the tables at the point of suspension during the coronavirus pandemic. Final placings were determined on a points per game basis at the curtailment of the resumed 2019–20 season in 2021.

=== Key ===
Symbol	Key
OL B	Oberliga Süd (1945–63) Bundesliga (1963–present)
2O RL 2B	2. Oberliga Süd (1950–63); Regionalliga Süd (1963–74): 2. Bundesliga (1974–present)
3L	3. Liga (2008–present)
R	Regionalliga Süd (1994–2012) Regionalliga Bayern (2012–present)
1	League champions
Place	League
Place	Played in opposite division
Blank	Played at a league level below this league
