= 1972–73 Bayernliga =

Bayernliga
- Season: 1972–73
- Champions: FC Augsburg
- Promoted: FC Augsburg
- Relegated: ASV Neumarkt: 1. FC Lichtenfels; 1. FC Nürnberg Amateure
- Amateur championship: ESV Ingolstadt
- Matches: 306
- Goals: 1,098 (3.59 per match)
- Top goalscorer: Norbert Knopf (30 goals)

The 1972–73 season of the Bayernliga, the third tier of the German football league system in the state of Bavaria at the time, was the 28th season of the league.

== Overview ==
The league champions FC Augsburg, winning their first Bayernliga title, were promoted to the Regionalliga Süd. FC Augsburg formed four years earlier in a merger of BC Augsburg and the football department of TSV Schwaben Augsburg, would go on to win the Regionalliga Süd in the following season and narrowly miss out on Bundesliga promotion.

Runners-up ESV Ingolstadt qualified for the German amateur championship, where the club was eliminated by eventual winners SpVgg Bad Homburg in the semi-finals.

The bottom three teams in the league were directly relegated. For FC Lichtenfels it marked the end of 27 consecutive seasons in the league, having been promoted to the Bayernliga in 1946. Lichtenfels would never return to the Bayernliga again while of the other two clubs, ASV Neumarkt would win direct promotion back to the league the following season and 1. FC Nürnberg Amateure would return in 1980.

Norbert Knopf of FC Herzogenaurach was the top scorer of the league with 30 goals, the second time he finished as the best scorer of the league after 1970–71.

== Table ==
The 1972–73 season saw four new clubs in the league, ASV Herzogenaurach, BSC Sendling and 1. FC Bayreuth, all promoted from the Landesliga Bayern, while ESV Ingolstadt had been relegated from the Regionalliga Süd to the league.

Ingolstadt had been playing in the Regionalliga for the previous four seasons after a Bayernliga championship in 1968, while Bayreuth returned after having been relegated from the league in 1970. Sending had last played in the Bayernliga in 1958 while Herzogenaurach was promoted to the league for the first time.

Pos	Team	Pld	W	D	L	GF	GA	GD	Pts	Promotion, qualification or relegation
1	FC Augsburg (C, P)	34	19	10	5	79	36	+43	48	Promotion to Regionalliga
2	ESV Ingolstadt (Q)	34	18	11	5	75	38	+37	47	Qualification to German amateur championship
3	ASV Herzogenaurach	34	19	6	9	77	72	+5	44	
4	FV Würzburg 04	34	19	5	10	79	51	+28	43	
5	SpVgg Büchenbach	34	15	11	8	60	50	+10	41	
6	MTV Ingolstadt	34	14	9	11	88	65	+23	37	
7	1. FC Bayreuth	34	15	7	12	72	56	+16	37	
8	SpVgg Vohenstrauß	34	13	10	11	73	63	+10	36	
9	SC Fürstenfeldbruck	34	14	8	12	56	57	−1	36	
10	1. FC Passau	34	11	9	14	56	58	−2	31	
11	FC Memmingen	34	12	7	15	48	56	−8	31	
12	FC Herzogenaurach	34	11	8	15	73	71	+2	30	
13	SpVgg Weiden	34	10	9	15	36	42	−6	29	
14	BSC Sendling	34	10	9	15	40	71	−31	29	
15	Kickers Würzburg	34	9	10	15	43	59	−16	28	
16	ASV Neumarkt (R)	34	9	8	17	43	71	−28	26	Relegation to Landesliga Bayern
17	1. FC Lichtenfels (R)	34	7	9	18	49	79	−30	23	Relegation to Landesliga Bayern
18	1. FC Nürnberg Amateure (R)	34	6	4	24	51	103	−52	16	Relegation to Landesliga Bayern

Source: manfredsfussballarchiv.de, f-archiv.de
Rules for classification: 1) Points;
(C) Champions; (P) Promoted; (Q) Qualified for the phase indicated; (R) Relegated
