= 1979–80 Bayernliga =

Bayernliga
- Season: 1979–80
- Champions: FC Augsburg
- Promoted: FC Augsburg
- Relegated: FC Wacker München FC Vilshofen VfR Neuburg FC Bayern Hof
- Amateur championship: FC Augsburg
- Matches played: 306
- Goals scored: 837 (2.74 per match)
- Top goalscorer: Wolfgang Ruhdorfer (27 goals)

The 1979–80 season of the Bayernliga, the third tier of the German football league system in the state of Bavaria at the time, was the 35th season of the league.

== Overview ==
The league champions FC Augsburg, winning their second Bayernliga title after 1972–73, were promoted to the 2. Bundesliga Süd and also qualified for the German amateur championship, where the club lost 2–1 in the final to VfB Stuttgart Amateure.

The bottom four clubs were directly relegated, 1979–80 being the last season before the introduction of the relegation/promotion play-off. Of the four clubs VfR Neuburg would never return to the Bayernliga again while FC Vilshofen made a direct return the following season. FC Wacker München, one of the most successful Bayernliga clubs until than, returned to the league in 1982 and FC Bayern Hof, having dropped out of professional football two years earlier, returned in 1983.

Wolfgang Ruhdorfer of FC Augsburg was the top scorer of the league with 27 goals. The 2.735 goals scored per match marked the lowest average in the history of the league and only the second time, after the previous season, that less than three goals were scored per game in a season.

== Table ==
The 1979–80 season saw four new clubs in the league, FC Herzogenaurach, VfB Helmbrechts and TSV Ampfing, all promoted from the Landesliga Bayern, while FC Augsburg had been relegated from the 2. Bundesliga Süd to the league.

Of the promoted teams FC Herzogenaurach had last played in the Bayernliga in 1977 and VfB Helmbrechts in 1971 while TSV Ampfing made its first appearance. FC Augsburg had last played in the Bayernliga in 1972–73, when the club won the league and earned promotion to the Regionalliga Süd.

Pos	Team	Pld	W	D	L	GF	GA	GD	Pts	Promotion, qualification or relegation
1	FC Augsburg (C, P)	34	20	7	7	70	29	+41	47	Promotion to 2. Bundesliga Süd
2	1. FC Haßfurt	34	17	7	10	49	43	+6	41	
3	FC Memmingen	34	17	5	12	42	41	+1	39	
4	FC Schweinfurt 05	34	16	4	14	50	44	+6	36	
5	ATS Kulmbach	34	15	6	13	53	54	−1	36	
6	ASV Neumarkt	34	11	13	10	43	37	+6	35	
7	FC Herzogenaurach	34	13	9	12	55	51	+4	35	
8	1. FC Amberg	34	11	13	10	38	35	+3	35	
9	Bayern Munich Amateure	34	13	8	13	47	55	−8	34	
10	VfB Helmbrechts	34	12	8	14	48	50	−2	32	
11	TSV Trebgast	34	14	4	16	43	45	−2	32	
12	TSV Ampfing	34	11	10	13	52	56	−4	32	
13	TSV 1860 Rosenheim	34	9	14	11	31	37	−6	32	
14	Kickers Würzburg	34	10	11	13	55	55	0	31	
15	FC Wacker München (R)	34	11	8	15	48	52	−4	30	Relegation to Landesliga Bayern
16	FC Vilshofen (R)	34	9	12	13	33	49	−16	30	Relegation to Landesliga Bayern
17	VfR Neuburg (R)	34	10	9	15	46	58	−12	29	Relegation to Landesliga Bayern
18	FC Bayern Hof (R)	34	9	8	17	34	46	−12	26	Relegation to Landesliga Bayern

Source: manfredsfussballarchiv.de, f-archiv.de
Rules for classification: 1) Points;
(C) Champions; (P) Promoted; (R) Relegated
