= 2. Amateurliga Bayern =

- Founded: 1951
- Folded: 1963
- Country: West Germany
- State: Bavaria
- Level on pyramid: Level 4
- Promotion to: Bayernliga
- Relegation to: Kreisliga

The 2. Amateurliga Bayern was a set of eleven regional leagues in Bavaria existing from 1951 to 1963 as the fourth tier of football in the state.

The leagues were disbanded in 1963, when the German football league system was reorganised with the introduction of the Bundesliga and replaced by the Landesligas.

== Overview ==
The 2. Amateurligas were introduced in Bavaria in 1951 to replace the previously existing Kreisligas at this level. This step was taken after the introduction of the 2nd Oberliga Süd as the new second division in southern Germany in 1950 and the renaming of the Landesliga Bayern to Amateurliga Bayern in 1951. The Landesliga had, until 1950, been functioning as one of the regional second divisions below the Oberliga Süd, alongside the Landesliga Nordbaden, the Landesliga Hessen and the Landesliga Württemberg.

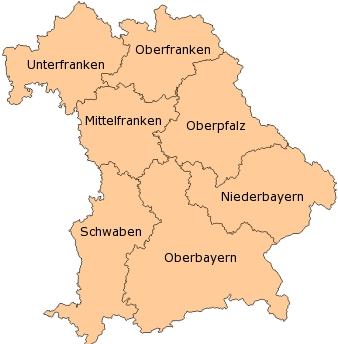
The seven Bavarian Regierungsbezirke

The 2. Amateurliga, as the fourth tier of the German league system, below the Amateurliga Bayern as the third, was sub-divided into seven regions, along the boundaries of the seven Regierungsbezirke, those regions being:

- Upper Bavaria - Oberbayern
- Lower Bavaria - Niederbayern
- Swabia - Schwaben
- Upper Palatinate - Oberpfalz
- Middle Franconia - Mittelfranken
- Lower Franconia - Unterfranken
- Upper Franconia - Oberfranken

Some of the seven regions of the 2. Amateurliga were in turn sub-divided into regional leagues, resulting in the existence of eleven leagues at this level:

- 2. Amateurliga Oberbayern A
- 2. Amateurliga Oberbayern B
- 2. Amateurliga Niederbayern
- 2. Amateurliga Schwaben
- 2. Amateurliga Oberpfalz
- 2. Amateurliga Mittelfranken Nord
- 2. Amateurliga Mittelfranken Süd
- 2. Amateurliga Unterfranken West
- 2. Amateurliga Unterfranken Ost
- 2. Amateurliga Oberfranken West
- 2. Amateurliga Oberfranken Ost

Within the four Regierungsbezirke who had two leagues, a championship was played to determine the local champions, but no overall 2. Amateurliga championship was held. Instead, the regional champions would play promotion rounds to determine the teams that would move up to the Amateurliga. The promotion rounds where sub-divided into northern and southern Bavaria. The champions of the three Franconian Regierungsbezirke would play in the northern group while the other four Regierungsbezirke would play in the southern one. Swabia had a special status within this system, being allowed to send both champions and runners-up to the promotion round. Originally, until 1957, the promotion rounds were held in two groups of six teams, playing a home-and-away round, with the top-two teams from each being promoted.

In 1953, the Amateurliga Bayern was split in itself in two regional divisions, north and south, resulting in two new leagues:

- Amateurliga Nordbayern - Northern Bavaria
- Amateurliga Südbayern - Southern Bavaria

This decision was made rather late, on 7 July 1953, after the promotion rounds had already been played, resulting in all twelve teams that had taken part being promoted.

The promotion system remained unchanged after this, two groups of six with the first two in each group still promoted. In 1955, three teams were promoted from the north because VfB Helmbrechts had been promoted to the 2nd Oberliga Süd, thereby providing an additional spot in the Amateurliga Nordbayern. An expansion of the Amateurliga Südbayern from 14 to 16 clubs in 1957 allowed four teams to be promoted from the south.

From 1957-58 onwards, the promotion system was changed. In the north, the three Regierungsbezirk champions were now directly promoted. In the south, the Oberbayern and Schwaben champions were directly promoted while the champions of Niederbayern and Oberpfalz played a decider for one more promotion spot.

In 1958, an additional spot was available because 1. FC Bamberg had been promoted to the second division, this was played out between the three runners-up. The same happened in 1959, when SpVgg Bayreuth moved up to the second division. In 1960, when Schwaben Augsburg was promoted to the 2nd Oberliga, the losing team of the Niederbayern versus Oberpfalz encounter was also promoted.

== Disbanding of the 2. Amateurligas ==
In 1963, the German league system was changed drastically. The Fußball-Bundesliga replaced the previously existing five Oberligas as the highest league in the country. Below it, five Regionalligas were created as the new second divisions.

On 27 April 1963, it was decided to reorganise the Bavarian league system, too. The two Amateurligas in Bavaria were reduced to a single division again, like until 1953. The 2nd Amateurligas were completely disbanded and replaced by three Landesligas as the new fourth tier, those being:

- Landesliga Bayern-Süd - covering Swabia and Upper Bavaria
- Landesliga Bayern-Mitte - covering Middle Franconia, Lower Bavaria and Upper Palatinate
- Landesliga Bayern-Nord - covering Lower and Upper Franconia

Apart from the ten clubs each that came from the two Amateurligas to the new Landesligas, the top-teams of the 2. Amateurligas in 1962-63 were also allowed to join the new leagues:

- From the 2. Amateurliga Schwaben
  - SV Mering
  - TSG Augsburg
  - FC Memmingen
  - TSV Kriegshaber
  - BC Aichach
- From the 2. Amateurliga Oberbayern
  - TSV 1860 Rosenheim
  - FC Deisenhofen
  - FSV Pfaffenhofen
  - ASV Dachau
  - Sportfreunde Pasing
- From the 2. Amateurliga Niederbayern
  - SV Saal
  - FC Dingolfing
  - SpVgg Deggendorf
- From the 2. Amateurliga Oberpfalz
  - TuS Rosenberg
  - FC Maxhütte-Haidhof
  - FC Schwarzenfeld
- From the 2. Amateurliga Mittelfranken
  - TV Erlangen
  - FC Hersbruck
  - SpVgg Erlangen
  - 1. FC Nuremberg II
  - FC Stein
  - ASV Neumarkt
- From the 2. Amateurliga Oberfranken
  - SC Sylvia Ebersdorf
  - ASV Gaustadt
  - VfB Bayreuth
  - VfB Arzberg
  - SpVgg Hof
- From the 2. Amateurliga Unterfranken
  - SV Großwallstadt
  - TSV Lohr
  - Frankonia Mechenhard
  - Bayern Kitzingen
  - Post SV Würzburg
  - FC Schweinfurt 05 II

All other clubs from the former 2. Amateurligas went to the Bezirksligas, which had existed since 1957, the fifth tier of league football.

== League champions ==
The champions of the eleven 2. Amateurligas in Bavaria were:

=== Southern Bavaria ===
Season	Oberbayern A	Oberbayern B	Niederbayern	Schwaben	Oberpfalz
1951–52	SC München-Süd	**SpVgg Helios München**	**SpVgg Plattling**	FC Kempten	SV Mitterteich
1952–53	**MTV Ingolstadt**	**FC Penzberg**	**SpVgg Deggendorf**	**TSV Kottern**	**SV Mitterteich**
1953–54	**BSC Sendling**	**TSV Raubling**	SV Saal	SpVgg Kaufbeuren	TV Sulzbach-Rosenberg
1954–55	TSG Pasing	**ASV Dachau**	SV Saal	**FC Memmingen**	FC Maxhütte-Haidhof
1955–56	**FC Bayern Munich II**	SV Aubing	1. FC Passau	FC Kempten	**1. FC Schwandorf**
1956–57	**TSG Pasing**	**SC 1906 München**	1. FC Passau	**FC Kempten**	FC Maxhütte-Haidhof
1957–58	**SpVgg Helios München**	SV Aubing	**1. FC Passau**	**SpVgg Kaufbeuren**	SpVgg Vohenstrauß
1958–59	**TSV 1860 Munich II**	FSV Pfaffenhofen	**SpVgg Deggendorf**	**FC Memmingen**	Turnerschaft Regensburg
1959–60	**TSV 1860 Rosenheim**	TSG Pasing	**SpVgg Landshut**	**TSV Kottern**	**TuS Rosenberg**
1960–61	FC Oberau	**ESV Ingolstadt**	**1. FC Passau**	**TSV Königsbrunn**	TV Wackersdorf
1961–62	Wacker Burghausen	**FC Wacker München**	SV Saal	**BC Augsburg II**	**Jahn Regensburg II**
1962–63	TSV 1860 Rosenheim	FSV Pfaffenhofen	SV Saal	SV Mering	TuS Rosenberg

=== Northern Bavaria ===
Season	Mittelfranken Nord	Mittelfranken Süd	Unterfranken West	Unterfranken Ost	Oberfranken West	Oberfranken Ost
1951–52	Jahn Forchheim	ASV Fürth	Viktoria Kahl	FC Bad Kissingen	**VfB Coburg**	**VfB Bayreuth**
1952–53	**ATSV Erlangen**	**FC Stein**	**Viktoria Kahl**	**TSV Gochsheim**	**FC Michelau**	**VfB Helmbrechts**
1953–54	SpVgg Erlangen	TSV Südwest Nürnberg	1. FC Haßfurt	FC Eibelstadt	**FC Pressig**	**SpVgg Bayreuth**
1954–55	**SpVgg Erlangen**	**1. FC Nuremberg II**	VfR Goldbach	Bayern Kitzingen	TSV Küps	**SpVgg Hof**
1955–56	ATSV Erlangen	**TSV 04 Schwabach**	Alemannia Haibach	ASV Rimpar	**SC Sylvia Ebersdorf**	Wacker Marktredwitz
1956–57	**SpVgg Büchenbach**	TSV Südwest Nürnberg	**1. FC Haßfurt**	VfR Goldbach	**SV Neuses**	1. FC Bayreuth
1957–58	**SpVgg Fürth II**	**ESV Nürnberg-West**	**SpVgg Niedernberg**	TSV Gochsheim	FC Wallenfels	**1. FC Bayreuth**
1958–59	**FC Hersbruck**	**ASV Nürnberg-Süd**	VfR Goldbach	**1. FC Haßfurt**	TSV Küps	**VfB Rehau**
1959–60	1. FC Röthenbach	**TSV Johannis Nürnberg**	TuS Aschaffenburg	**FV 04 Würzburg**	ASV Gaustadt	**ATS Kulmbach**
1960–61	**FC Hersbruck**	ASV Zirndorf	Alemannia Haibach	**ASV Rimpar**	**Wacker Marktredwitz**	SV Neuses
1961–62	FC Schnaittach	**ASV Zirndorf**	Frankonia Mechenhard	**TSV Gochsheim**	**1. FC Bayreuth**	SV Neuses
1962–63	TV Erlangen	1. FC Nuremberg II	SV Großwallstadt	Bayern Kitzingen	SC Sylvia Ebersdorf	VfB Bayreuth

- Promoted teams in **Bold**.
- In 1953, FC Memmingen, runners-up in Schwaben, was also promoted.
- In 1957, TSV Gersthofen, runners-up in Schwaben, was also promoted.
