= 1990–91 Bayernliga =

Bayernliga
- Season: 1990–91
- Champions: TSV 1860 Munich
- Promoted: TSV 1860 Munich
- Relegated: 1. FC Amberg; VfB Helmbrechts Kickers Würzburg
- Amateur championship: SpVgg Unterhaching
- Matches played: 272
- Goals scored: 869 (3.19 per match)
- Top goalscorer: Christian Radlmaier (20 goals)

The 1990–91 season of the Bayernliga, the third tier of the German football league system in the state of Bavaria at the time, was the 46th season of the league.

== Overview ==
The league champions, TSV 1860 Munich, were promoted to the 2. Bundesliga after successfully competing in the promotion round. For 1860 Munich it was their second Bayernliga title after 1983–84 and ended a nine-season spell in the league after having been forcibly relegated from the 2. Bundesliga at the end of the 1981–82 season for financial reasons. For the club it marked the third time it competed in the promotion round to the 2. Bundesliga, having been unsuccessful on the previous two occasions in 1983–84 and 1985–86, the latter as the league runners-up when SpVgg Landshut had declined to apply for a 2. Bundesliga licence.

Runners-up SpVgg Unterhaching qualified for the German amateur championship, where it came second in the southern group and was knocked out.

The three bottom clubs were directly relegated from the league while 14th placed SpVgg Bayreuth had to enter the relegation round with the Landesliga runners-up where it secured its league place through victories over VfL Frohnlach and FC Gundelfingen. Of the relegated clubs, 1. FC Amberg returned in 1994 but folded at the end of the 1994–95 season, with a new club, FC Amberg, formed as successor. VfB Helmbrechts returned to the Bayernliga in 1993 while Kickers Würzburg made a return in 1997.

Christian Radlmaier of TSV Eching was the league's top scorer with 20 goals, his first of two Bayernliga top scorer awards.

== Table ==
The 1991–92 season saw six new clubs in the league, TSV Eching, SV Lohhof, Jahn Regensburg and Kickers Würzburg, all promoted from the Landesliga Bayern, while SpVgg Bayreuth and SpVgg Unterhaching had been relegated from the 2. Bundesliga to the league.

For SV Lohhof it was the first-ever season in the league while Eching had last played in the league in 1986, Regensburg in 1988 and Würzburg in 1983. Of the two clubs relegated to the league Unterhaching had won it in 1988–89 and Bayreuth in 1986–87, both thereby earning promotion to the 2. Bundesliga.

Pos	Team	Pld	W	D	L	GF	GA	GD	Pts	Promotion, qualification or relegation
1	TSV 1860 Munich (C, P)	32	22	10	0	62	21	+41	54	Qualification to 2. Bundesliga promotion round
2	SpVgg Unterhaching (Q)	32	20	7	5	76	33	+43	47	Qualification to German amateur championship
3	SpVgg Weiden	32	18	7	7	63	38	+25	43	
4	FC Bayern Munich Amateure	32	16	7	9	58	39	+19	39	
5	MTV Ingolstadt	32	15	7	10	63	46	+17	37	
6	TSV Eching	32	14	8	10	69	59	+10	36	
7	FC Memmingen	32	13	9	10	48	43	+5	35	
8	FC Augsburg	32	13	6	13	51	47	+4	32	
9	SV Lohhof	32	11	10	11	45	43	+2	32	
10	TSV Vestenbergsgreuth	32	10	10	12	51	42	+9	30	
11	SSV Jahn Regensburg	32	11	8	13	55	53	+2	30	
12	SV Türk Gücü München	32	10	9	13	41	51	−10	29	
13	SpVgg Plattling	32	10	7	15	45	60	−15	27	
14	SpVgg Bayreuth	32	10	6	16	41	52	−11	26	Qualification to relegation play-off
15	1. FC Amberg (R)	32	9	6	17	44	76	−32	24	Relegation to Landesliga Bayern
16	VfB Helmbrechts (R)	32	5	4	23	32	83	−51	14	Relegation to Landesliga Bayern
17	Kickers Würzburg (R)	32	2	5	25	25	83	−58	9	Relegation to Landesliga Bayern

Source: manfredsfussballarchiv.de, f-archiv.de
Rules for classification: 1) Points; 2) Decider;
(C) Champions; (P) Promoted; (Q) Qualified for the phase indicated; (R) Relegated

== 2. Bundesliga promotion round ==
In the southern group the champions of the Oberliga Baden-Württemberg, Oberliga Hessen, Oberliga Südwest and the Bayernliga competed for one promotion spot to the 2. Bundesliga:

Pos	Team	Pld	W	D	L	GF	GA	GD	Pts	Promotion, qualification or relegation
1	TSV 1860 Munich (P)	6	3	3	0	11	5	+6	9	Promotion to 2. Bundesliga
2	KSV Hessen Kassel	6	2	3	1	8	6	+2	7	
3	1. FC Pforzheim	6	2	1	3	8	11	−3	5	
4	Borussia Neunkirchen	6	0	3	3	5	10	−5	3	

Source: Weltfussball.de
Rules for classification: 1) Points; 2) Goal difference;
(P) Promoted

== Bayernliga promotion round ==
The 14th placed Bayernliga team had to face the runners-up of the three Landesligas for one more place in the Bayernliga.

Date	Match			Result
Semi-finals : in Kulmbach and Nördlingen
9 June 1991	VfL Frohnlach (Nord)	–	SpVgg Bayreuth	0–1
9 June 1991	FC Gundelfingen (Süd)	–	1. FC Nürnberg Amateure (Mitte)	1–0
Final : in Feucht
15 June 1991	SpVgg Bayreuth	–	FC Gundelfingen	3–0
