= Paul Hesselbach =

German footballer

Personal information
- Date of birth: 6 July 1951
- Place of birth: Nürnberg, West Germany
- Position: Goalkeeper

Senior career*
Years	Team	Apps	(Gls)
1970–1973	1. FC Nürnberg		
1973–1976	1. FC Amberg		
1976–1982	Bayer 05 Uerdingen		
1982	Borussia Mönchengladbach		
1982–1983	TuS Schloß Neuhaus		
1983–1985	Stuttgarter Kickers		
1985–1987	ASV Herzogenaurach		

Managerial career
- 1987–1989: SpVgg Fürth
- 1990–1991: SpVgg Bayreuth
- 1991–1993: TSV Vestenbergsgreuth
- 1994–1996: TSV Vestenbergsgreuth
- 1997–2001: SpVgg Greuther Fürth (assistant)
- 2000: SpVgg Greuther Fürth (caretaker)
- 2001: SpVgg Greuther Fürth
- 2006–2007: SG Quelle Fürth
- * Club domestic league appearances and goals

Paul Hesselbach (born 6 July 1951) is a retired German football goalkeeper and later manager.
