= 2001–02 Bayernliga =

Bayernliga
- Season: 2001–02
- Champions: FC Augsburg
- Promoted: FC Augsburg
- Relegated: Würzburger FV: 1. FC Sand; MTV Ingolstadt FC Memmingen ASV Neumarkt
- Matches: 342
- Goals: 1,058 (3.09 per match)
- Top goalscorer: Rico Hanke (25 goals)

The 2001–02 season of the Bayernliga, the fourth tier of the German football league system in the state of Bavaria at the time, was the 57th season of the league.

== Overview ==
The league champions, FC Augsburg, won promotion to the Regionalliga Süd. It was Augsburgs fifth Bayernliga title, having previously won the league in 1972–73, 1979–80, 1981–82 and 1993–94. Augsburg had been forcibly relegated to the Bayernliga for financial reasons despite finishing eighth in the Regionalliga in 1999–2000.

Of the five relegated clubs MTV Ingolstadt was the only one never to return to the Bayernliga, merging with ESV Ingolstadt in 2004 to form FC Ingolstadt 04. FC Memmingen and Würzburger FV won promotion back to the league in the following season while 1. FC Sand and ASV Neumarkt both returned in 2012 when the league was expanded to two divisions.

Rico Hanke of TSV 1860 München II was the top scorer of the league with 25 goals.

== Table ==
The 2001–02 season saw five new clubs in the league, SpVgg Greuther Fürth Amateure, SpVgg Unterhaching Amateure, SpVgg Bayreuth and FC Falke Markt Schwaben, all promoted from the Landesliga Bayern, while TSV 1860 München Amateure had been relegated from the Regionalliga Süd to the league.

Of the four promoted clubs three played their first-ever Bayernliga season in 2001–02 while the fourth, SpVgg Bayreuth, was one of the most successful clubs in the league but had been relegated in 1999. TSV 1860 München Amateure returned to the Bayernliga after a league championship in 1999 and four seasons in the Regionalliga.

Pos	Team	Pld	W	D	L	GF	GA	GD	Pts	Promotion, qualification or relegation
1	FC Augsburg (C, P)	36	29	2	5	93	34	+59	89	Promotion to Regionalliga
2	TSV 1860 München Amateure	36	23	8	5	79	34	+45	77	
3	1. FC Nürnberg Amateure	36	21	6	9	84	44	+40	69	
4	FC Bayern Hof	36	19	6	11	59	47	+12	63	
5	SpVgg Greuther Fürth Amateure	36	17	9	10	77	49	+28	60	
6	SpVgg Unterhaching Amateure	36	14	9	13	48	46	+2	51	
7	SpVgg Bayreuth	36	14	7	15	48	52	−4	49	
8	SG Quelle Fürth	36	13	9	14	54	47	+7	48	
9	FC Ismaning	36	13	9	14	51	57	−6	48	
10	TSV Aindling	36	14	5	17	57	55	+2	47	
11	SC 04 Schwabach	36	14	5	17	60	73	−13	47	
12	SpVgg Weiden	36	13	7	16	56	63	−7	46	
13	FC Falke Markt Schwaben	36	12	10	14	40	52	−12	46	
14	1.SC Feucht	36	12	9	15	57	53	+4	45	
15	Würzburger FV (R)	36	11	9	16	47	68	−21	42	Qualification to relegation round to the Landesliga Bayern
16	1. FC Sand (R)	36	8	13	15	47	74	−27	37	Relegation to Landesliga Bayern
17	MTV Ingolstadt (R)	36	7	12	17	29	62	−33	33	Relegation to Landesliga Bayern
18	FC Memmingen (R)	36	7	7	22	42	79	−37	28	Relegation to Landesliga Bayern
19	ASV Neumarkt (R)	36	4	12	20	30	69	−39	24	Relegation to Landesliga Bayern

Source: weltfussball.de, f-archiv.de
Rules for classification: 1) Points; 2) Decider;
(C) Champions; (P) Promoted; (R) Relegated

== Bayernliga promotion round ==
The 15th placed Bayernliga team had to face the runners-up of the three Landesligas for one more place in the Bayernliga.

=== First round ===
Team 1	Score	Team 2
VfL Frohnlach (Nord)	4–3	Würzburger FV

Team 1	Score	Team 2
TSV Schwaben Augsburg (Süd)	1–1 aet (5–3 pen)	SpVgg Landshut (Mitte)

=== Second round ===
Team 1	Score	Team 2
VfL Frohnlach	1–3	TSV Schwaben Augsburg
