= Günter Güttler =

German footballer and manager

Personal information
- Full name: Günter Güttler
- Date of birth: 31 May 1961 (age 65)
- Place of birth: Erlangen, West Germany
- Height: 1.91 m (6 ft 3 in)
- Position: Midfielder

Youth career
- –1980: ASV Herzogenaurach

Senior career*
Years	Team	Apps	(Gls)
1980–1983	Bayern Munich	11	(2)
1983–1984	KV Mechelen	10	(0)
1984–1987	1. FC Nürnberg	88	(10)
1987–1990	Waldhof Mannheim	85	(5)
1990–1994	Schalke 04	119	(4)
1994–1996	SpVgg Fürth	28	(1)
Total		341	(22)

Managerial career
- 1996–1998: 1. FC Köln (assistant)
- 1998–2001: ASV Neumarkt
- 2001–2003: Rapid Wien (assistant)
- 2006–2008: Jahn Regensburg
- 2008–2009: Wacker Burghausen
- 2010: SpVgg Weiden
- 2013–2014: Sportbund DJK Rosenheim
- 2015–2016: TSV Ampfing
- * Club domestic league appearances and goals

Günter Güttler (born 31 May 1961 in Erlangen) is a German former professional football player and manager.

== Honours ==
Bayern Munich

- Bundesliga: 1980–81
- DFB-Pokal: 1981–82
- European Cup: runner-up 1981–82
