= 1. FC Passau =

German football club

- Full name: 1. Fussball-Club Passau 1911 e.V.
- Founded: 1911
- Ground: Drei Flüsse Stadion
- Capacity: 19,800
- Chairman: Franz Guppenberger
- Manager: Thomas Fuchs
- League: Bezirksliga Niederbayern-Ost (VII)
- 2015–16: 2nd
Home colours

The 1. FC Passau is a German association football club from the city of Passau, Bavaria.

Throughout its existence, the club played on a number of occasions in the tier-three Bayernliga. It also reached the first round of the national German Cup once.

== History ==
The club was formed in 1911, under the name of FC Passau. It came into existence when the football department of local TV Passau, formed in 1862, left the club to go its own way. In its early days, the football club, like so many others in Germany at the time, suffered under the lack of a playing field. FCP was lucky enough to convince the commander of the Bavarian 16th Infantry Regiment, based in the city, to let them use their training ground. The club became virtually defunct during and after the First World War, becoming nothing more than the football department of TV Passau once more again after the war. It only resurfaced in 1924. In 1951, the club changed its name to 1. FC Passau.

Passau did not enter the higher Bavarian football scene until well after the Second World War when, in 1958, the team won the tier-four 2nd Amateurliga Niederbayern. It took three games against Upper Palatinate champions SpVgg Vohenstrauß to secure promotion to the Amateurliga Südbayern for the first time. Previously, in 1956 and 1957, the club had already won this league but failed in the promotion round. In this league, 1. FCP escaped relegation by only one point in the first season there, 1958–59. The year after, the club was not so lucky and dropped down to the fourth division again.

Passau once more won the local 2nd Amateurliga, defeated TV Wackersdorf in two games and returned to the third division in 1961. It could however not sustain this level and returned once more to the 2nd Amateruliga the year after.

The club was not one of the lucky three to qualify for the new Landesliga Bayern-Mitte in 1963 and instead was grouped in the tier-five Bezirksliga that year. It earned promotion back to the fourth tier in its first season there and entered the Landesliga for 1964–65.

In its second season in this league, the team finished second, ten points behind Jahn Regensburg. After an unimpressive 1966–67 season, the team won the league the year after and earned promotion to the Amateurliga Bayern.

In the third division, the club established itself as a mid-table side, rising to a fourth-place finish in 1973–74, the club's best ever. After two more seasons with mid-table finishes, Passau came last in the league in 1977 and had to return to the Landesliga after a nine-season absence. That season, it also qualified for the first round of the German Cup, losing 6–2 after extra time at Arminia Bielefeld.

Back in the Landesliga, the club did not perform particularly well and was relegated back to the Bezirksliga in 1981. It spent only one season there before returning to the Landesliga in 1982.

In the 1983–84 season, the team finished on equal points on a relegation rank with TSV Vestenbergsgreuth and ASV Herzogenaurach but lost the relegation deciders and once more dropped down to the Bezirksliga.

This time, it spent two seasons at this level before returning to the Landeliga. The club returned as a more competitive side and a third place in the league in 1988–89, on equal points with SpVgg Fürth, who it lost a second-place decider to, showed, 1. FC Passau was heading for better times. The year after, it finished equal first with Jahn Regensburg but once more lost in the decider for the championship. It did enter the promotion round for the Landesliga-runners-up but also lost there in the final, 3–0 to SV Lohhof.

In 1991–92, the club finally achieved promotion back to Bavarias highest league, now called Amateur Oberliga Bayern, on the strength of a Landesliga title.

Passau once again established itself as a mid-table side in the league, spending eight seasons at this level, with a sixth place in 1998 as its best result. In decline after this, it suffered relegation back to the Landesliga in 1999–2000.

The team did not perform well in its first season back in the Landesliga, but improved in the following seasons and, after a second-place finish, earned promotion back to the Bayernliga via a 3–1 victory over TSV Großbardorf in the promotion games. The club never did particularly well in the league this time round and was relegated after three seasons in 2006, with only six wins out of 34 games.

Passaus performance in the Landesliga the year after was one of their worst ever, unable to win a game all season and achieving only seven draws out of 38 games. With 16 goals scored and 127 goals conceded, the club holds quite a number of all-time negative records in this league now. As of 2008–09, the club is the only one ever to finish a Landesliga season without a win, out of three regional divisions and 44 seasons.

Relegated to the Bezirksoberliga Niederbayern, the club broke the fall, finishing in midfield in 2007–08. From there, the club improved, finishing fourth the season after.

At the end of the 2011–12 season the club qualified directly for the newly expanded Landesliga after finishing sixth in the Bezirksoberliga. After a third place in its first season back in the Landesliga the club came only 15th in the following year and was relegated back to the Bezirksliga.

== Honours ==
The club's honours:

=== League ===
- Landesliga Bayern-Mitte (IV-V)
  - Champions: (2) 1968, 1992
  - Runners-up: (3) 1966, 1990, 2003
- 2nd Amateurliga Niederbayern (IV)
  - Champions: (4) 1956, 1957, 1958, 1961
- Bezirksoberliga Niederbayern
  - Runners-up: 2011

== Recent seasons ==
The recent season-by-season performance of the club:

Season	Division	Tier	Position
1999–2000	Bayernliga	IV	18th ↓
2000–01	Landesliga Bayern-Mitte	V	12th
2001–02	Landesliga Bayern-Mitte	V	4th
2002–03	Landesliga Bayern-Mitte	V	2nd ↑
2003–04	Bayernliga	IV	15th
2004–05	Bayernliga	IV	13th
2005–06	Bayernliga	IV	18th ↓
2006–07	Landesliga Bayern-Mitte	V	19th ↓
2007–08	Bezirksoberliga Niederbayern	VI	8th
2008–09	Bezirksoberliga Niederbayern	VII	4th
2009–10	Bezirksoberliga Niederbayern	VII	6th
2010–11	Bezirksoberliga Niederbayern	VII	2nd
2011–12	Bezirksoberliga Niederbayern	VII	6th ↑
2012–13	Landesliga Bayern-Südost	VI	3rd
2013–14	Landesliga Bayern-Südost	VI	15th ↓
2014–15	Bezirksliga Niederbayern-Ost	VII	3rd
2015–16	Bezirksliga Niederbayern-Ost	VII	2nd
2016–17	Bezirksliga Niederbayern-Ost	VII	

- With the introduction of the Bezirksoberligas in 1988 as the new fifth tier, below the Landesligas, all leagues below dropped one tier. With the introduction of the Regionalligas in 1994 and the 3. Liga in 2008 as the new third tier, below the 2. Bundesliga, all leagues below dropped one tier. With the establishment of the Regionalliga Bayern as the new fourth tier in Bavaria in 2012 the Bayernliga was split into a northern and a southern division, the number of Landesligas expanded from three to five and the Bezirksoberligas abolished. All leagues from the Bezirksligas onwards were elevated one tier.

=== Key ===
↑ Promoted	↓ Relegated

== DFB Cup appearances ==
The club has qualified for the first round of the German Cup only once:

Season	Round	Date	Home	Away	Result	Attendance
DFB-Pokal 1976–77	First round	6 August 1976	Arminia Bielefeld	1. FC Passau	6–2 aet	3,900
