= ESV Nürnberg-West =

German football club

- Full name: Eisenbahner-Sportverein Nürnberg-West Fürth
- Founded: 17 September 1948
- Ground: Sportgelände in der Regelsbacher Straße
- Capacity: 10,000
- League: defunct

The ESV Nürnberg-West is a defunct German association football club from the city of Nuremberg (German: Nürnberg), Bavaria.

The club's most successful era was in 1960s when it spent six season in the tier three Bayernliga.

== History ==
ESV Nürnberg-West Fürth was formed on 17 September 1948 in the merger of three local clubs, TSV Nürnberg-West (formed 1891), Reichsbahnsportvereinigung Fürth (formed 1928) und des Reichsbahn Sportverein Nürnberg (formed 1930).

In the 1957–58 season the club won the southern division of the 2. Amateurliga Mittelfranken but lost the Middle Franconian championship to the reserve team of SpVgg Fürth, SpVgg Fürth II. In the following promotion round ESV defeated FC Wallenfels and TSV Gochsheim and earned promotion to the northern division of the Bayernliga.

ESV Nürnberg-West spent the next five seasons from 1958 to 1963 in the northern division of the Bayernliga. After a thirteenth place in its first season there the club improved every year, to the point where it finished runners-up in 1962. The following season however, when it needed to finish in the top seven to qualify for the new single division Bayernliga the club came only ninth and missed out.

As a consequence ESV was grouped in the new fourth division Landesliga Bayern-Mitte instead. The club finished runners-up in the league in its first season but this was followed by two mid-table finishes in 1965 and 1966. In the 1966–67 season ESV managed to win the league and earn promotion to the Bayernliga for the second time.

Back in the Bayernliga for a single season in 1967–68 the club managed only fourteen points in thirty four games and was promptly relegated again. The fortunes of ESV declined after that, with a sixth place in 1970 as its best result in the following six Landesliga seasons. In 1974 a fifteenth place in the league meant another relegation, with the club never returning to this level again.

ESV disappeared into lower amateur league football after this. By the mid-1990s the club experienced more and more financial difficulties. The club, as a railways sports club, depended on the German railway, the Deutsche Bundesbahn to provide it with sports grounds. The German railway in turn demanded that, for preferential financial treatment it required the club to have a set percentage of railway employees in its ranks, something ESV found difficult to achieve. At the same time another local club, FSV Gostenhof 1883, who themselves had played three seasons in the Bayernliga from 1948 to 1952, was financially healthy but lacked a sufficiently sized home ground. In 1998 the two clubs decided on a merger and, in August 1998 a new club was formed, the SG Nürnberg Fürth 1883, ending ESV's existence a month short of its fiftieth anniversary.

== Stadium ==
The club played its home games at the Sportgelände in der Regelsbacher Straße, holding 10,000 spectators. The clubs sports facilities where second in size only to those of 1. FC Nürnberg within the city of Nürnberg. The facilities where owned by the German railways and rented by the club.

== Honours ==
The club's honours:

- Bayernlig Nord
  - Runners-up: 1962
- 2. Amateurliga Mittelfranken Süd
  - Champions: 1958
- Landesliga Bayern-Mitte
  - Champions: 1967
  - Runners-up: 1964
