= SC Sylvia Ebersdorf =

German amateur football club

SC Sylvia Ebersdorf is an amateur sports club from Ebersdorf in Bavaria, Germany. Over the course of 100 years, the club is known primarily known for promoting football, but also has facilities for lawn tennis.

== History ==
The club was established in 1912 and in the early 1930s appeared briefly in the Upper Franconian Bezirksliga. In 1956, Sylvia was promoted to the Amateurliga Nordbayern (III), but was immediately relegated. The team became part of the newly formed Landesliga Bayern-Nord (IV) in 1963 and narrowly missed promotion to the Bayernliga (III) after a second-place result. They remained in the Landesliga until being relegated in 1970 and made a single season cameo appearance there in 1974–75.

In 2018, the club captured their first district league title in 26 years to earn a return to the Bezirksliga Franken West.
