= 1. FC Herzogenaurach =

German football club

- Full name: 1. Fussball Club 1916 Herzogenaurach e.V.
- Nickname: The Pumas
- Founded: 1916
- Ground: Rudolf-Dassler-Sportfeld
- Capacity: 1.500
- Chairman: Walter Nussel
- Manager: Matthias Zenger
- League: Landesliga Bayern (VI)
- 2018–19: Landesliga Bayern (VI), 5th
Home colours	Away colours

1. FC Herzogenaurach is a German association football club from Herzogenaurach, a suburb of the city of Nuremberg, Bavaria.

The history of the club is strongly intertwined with the local sports equipment manufacturer Puma, then just a local company and sponsor of the FC and its rivalry to ASV Herzogenaurach, which was sponsored by another local company, Adidas.

== History ==
=== Early years ===
Formed in 1916, the club did not begin to play competitive football till 1919 due to the difficult circumstances of the First World War. Between the two world wars, the club played on local Middle Franconian level, at times as high as the Bezirksliga, the local third division.

With the rise of the Nazis, the club profited from the disbanding of the local workers club Freie Union, a predecessor to the ASV Herzogenaurach. FC gained a considerable number of players from this in 1933.

After the Second World War, the club played in the local A-Klasse, later the Bezirksliga Mittelfranken-Nord. With a championship in the later in 1965–66, the FC's rise to the higher Bavarian amateur leagues begun.

=== Rise ===
In the Landesliga Bayern-Mitte for the first time for the 1966–67 season, the club finished in a respectable eleventh spot and repeated this result the season after. In November 1967, it was offered a sponsorship by the Puma AG, which it accepted, a fact which earned it its later nickname The Pumas. Puma offered a similar sponsorship to the other club in town, ASV Herzogenaurach, but was beaten to this by Adidas, its long-term rival. The rivalry between Puma and Adidas, which is in truth the rivalry of the two brothers who owned the companies then, Rudolf Dassler and Adolf Dassler, actually predates the rivalry of the two football clubs, stretching back to 1948.

In the Landesliga in 1968–69, the club met its local rival once more, the ASV having earned promotion to the league in 1968. The first season there together, ASV finished fourth while the FC came third, the clubs being separated by one point. The season after, the FC won the league and earned promotion to the Amateurliga Bayern (III) while the ASV came third. The ASV had to wait another two seasons to do the same and win the league and promotion in 1972.

=== Bayernliga years ===
While the FC enjoyed two good first seasons in the highest league in the state, it did not so well when the ASV joined it there and with a third place in 1972–73, the Adidas-club finished above the Puma-team for the first time in years while FC went into decline for a time.

The 1973–74 season became even more upsetting for the club as the ASV won the Amateurliga Bayern title while FC Herzogenaurach found itself relegated from the league, finishing 17th.

Spending the next three seasons in the Landesliga, FC worked hard on a return to the Amateurliga, finishing in the top-three each year. FC earned its return to the Amateurliga Bayern through another league championship in 1977, the year ASV found itself relegated from the Bayernliga.

The club managed to survive in the league for only one season before being handed down once more. Back in the Landesliga for 1978–79, it finished top of the league once more, beating ASV by a point to it.

Upon return to what was now the Amateur Oberliga Bayern, the FC earned a respectabel seventh place before suffering relegation from the league the season after in 1981.

The late 1970s also saw the rise of two promising young footballers in Herzogenaurach who went to school together. Günter Güttler, who played for the ASV and later joined FC Bayern Munich and Lothar Matthäus, who played for the FC and became Germany's most capped footballer. Matthäus could not play for the ASV even though it had at that time the better under-19's side, because his father worked for Puma.

=== Decline ===
Back in the Landesliga Bayern-Mitte, the FC's started to fluctuate between Landesliga and Bezirksliga. FC suffered three relegations from the Landesliga in the 1980s, in 1983, 1985 and finally in 1989, on which instance both Herzogenaurach clubs left the Landesliga for good. In the Bezirksoberliga Mittelfranken in 1989–90, a last-place finish meant a further drop, now to the Bezirksliga Mittelfranken-Nord. There, the club managed to halt its decline for the time, spending four seasons in the league. In 1994, it dropped further, now to the Kreisliga. In 1998, another relegation took the team down to the Kreisklasse level. Since then, it has fluctuated between the two.

=== Current ===
The club played in the Kreisliga Erlangen/Pegnitzgrund (IX) in 2008–09, the second-lowest league in the region. Its old rival, the ASV Herzogenaurach had fallen down even deeper in the league system, playing two levels below in the A-Klasse Erlangen/Pegnitzgrund (X)

In 2010, the club suffered another relegation, down to the Kreisklasse, where it met ASV in 2010–11. While the FC successfully played for the league championship and promotion that season, ASV came a distant last.

The old rivalry between the two clubs may have lost some of its punch, as has the local rivalry between the two sports brands. The town of Herzogenaurach is certainly not as divided any more as it once was. In March 2007, a merger of the three local clubs was even discussed, the ASV and FC together with the SC Nord should form one club which would then be capable to reach Regionalliga level.

The rivalry of the two companies, and with it to some extent the local football club issue, gained some international attention during the 2006 FIFA World Cup in Germany, when a number of international news organizations picked up on it.

In 2014 the club won the local Kreisklasse championship and earned promotion to the tier seven Bezirksliga but lasted for only one season before being relegated again. FCH won another Kreisliga championship in 2015–16 and returned to the Bezirksliga.

== Honours ==
=== League ===
- Landesliga Bayern-Mitte (IV)
  - Champions: (3) 1970, 1977, 1979
  - Runners-up: 1975
- Bezirksliga Mittelfranken-Nord (V)
  - Champions: 1966, 1987
  - Runners-up: 1986
- Kreisliga Erlangen/Pegnitzgrund (VIII)
  - Champions: 2014, 2016
- Kreisklasse Erlangen/Pegnitzgrund (X)
  - Champions: 2011

=== Cup ===
- Bavarian Cup
  - Winners: 1954
- Mittelfranken Cup
  - Winners: 1975

== Recent seasons ==
The recent season-by-season performance of the club:

Season	Division	Tier	Position
2003–04	Kreisliga 1 Erlangen/Forchheim	VIII	13th
2004–05	Kreisliga 1 Erlangen/Forchheim	VIII	16th ↓
2005–06	Kreisklasse 1 Erlangen-Forchheim	IX	9th
2006–07	Kreisklasse 1 Erlangen/Pegnitzgrund	IX	2nd ↑
2007–08	Kreisliga 1 Erlangen/Pegnitzgrund	VIII	10th
2008–09	Kreisliga 1 Erlangen/Pegnitzgrund	IX	10th
2009–10	Kreisliga 1 Erlangen/Pegnitzgrund	IX	14th ↓
2010–11	Kreisklasse Erlangen/Pegnitzgrund	X	1st ↑
2011–12	Kreisliga 1 Erlangen/Pegnitzgrund	IX	2nd ↑
2012–13	Kreisliga 1 Erlangen/Pegnitzgrund	VIII	5th
2013–14	Kreisliga 1 Erlangen/Pegnitzgrund	VIII	1st ↑
2014–15	Bezirksliga Mittelfranken 1	VII	14th ↓
2015–16	Kreisliga 1 Erlangen/Pegnitzgrund	VIII	1st ↑
2016–17	Bezirksliga Mittelfranken 1	VII	4th
2017–18	Bezirksliga Mittelfranken 1	VII	1st ↑
2018–19	Landesliga Bayern	VI	5th

- With the introduction of the Bezirksoberligas in 1988 as the new fifth tier, below the Landesligas, all leagues below dropped one tier. With the introduction of the Regionalligas in 1994 and the 3. Liga in 2008 as the new third tier, below the 2. Bundesliga, all leagues below dropped one tier. With the establishment of the Regionalliga Bayern as the new fourth tier in Bavaria in 2012 the Bayernliga was split into a northern and a southern division, the number of Landesligas expanded from three to five and the Bezirksoberligas abolished. All leagues from the Bezirksligas onwards were elevated one tier.

↑ Promoted	↓ Relegated

== ASV versus FC ==
The Herzogenaurach derby in the Bayernliga and Landesliga:

Season	League	Teams	Home	Away
1968–69	Landesliga Bayern-Mitte	ASV Herzogenaurach – FC Herzogenaurach	1–0	1–5
1969–70	Landesliga Bayern-Mitte	ASV Herzogenaurach – FC Herzogenaurach	0–1	1–0
1972–73	Amateurliga Bayern	ASV Herzogenaurach – FC Herzogenaurach	1–3	2–0
1973–74	Amateurliga Bayern	ASV Herzogenaurach – FC Herzogenaurach	0–1	2–0
1978–79	Landesliga Bayern-Mitte	ASV Herzogenaurach – FC Herzogenaurach	1–2	2–2
1981–82	Landesliga Bayern-Mitte	ASV Herzogenaurach – FC Herzogenaurach	1–1	2–2
1982–83	Landesliga Bayern-Mitte	ASV Herzogenaurach – FC Herzogenaurach	2–2	4–2
1984–85	Landesliga Bayern-Mitte	ASV Herzogenaurach – FC Herzogenaurach	2–2	4–2

- Source: Manfreds Fussball Archiv Tables and results of the Bavarian amateur leagues

== Former players ==
- Lothar Matthäus, Germany's most-capped player started and ended his career with the club.

== DFB Cup appearances ==
The club has qualified for the first round of the German Cup just once:

Season	Round	Date	Home	Away	Result	Attendance
DFB Cup 1975-76	First round	1 August 1975	SGO Bremen	FC Herzogenaurach	5–1	
