= SpVgg Helios München =

German football club

Helios München
- Full name: Spielvereinigung Helios 1919 München e.V.
- Founded: 1919
- Manager: Wolfgang Wahl
- League: Kreisklasse 5 (IX)
- 2015–16: 3rd
Home colours	Away colours

SpVgg Helios München, now playing as SV Helios Daglfing München, is a German association football club from the city of Munich, Bavaria. The club was established 1 March 1919 out of the football department of Turn- und Sportverein Jahn München. In October of that year, the departed footballers of TSV were replaced by the arrival of the footballers from the Münchener Sportclub, who had originally played as Bayern Munich. In 1923, this group departed in turn, restoring Bayern as an independent club, and opening the way for Helios to rejoin parent TSV. The reunion was short-lived and Helios again went its own way as a separate side sometime later in the 1920s.

== History ==
In 1924, Helios managed to advance to the Kreisliga Südbayern (II), but through most of their history remained part of lower tier local competition. In the early 1950s and on into the early 1960s, the team spent eight seasons as part of the Amateurliga Bayern (III) or Amateurliga Südbayern (III) where they finished third in 1962 and 1963. Following the formation of the new national first division Bundesliga and the five second division Regionalligen in 1963, the Amateurliga Bayern became a third tier circuit. Helios earned only mid- and lower table finishes over their next nine campaigns and were finally relegated in 1972. The club spent one season at the division four Landesliga Bayern-Süd, but was immediately relegated again, now to the Bezirksliga Oberbayern-Ost. At this level too, the club lasted for only one season before going down to the A-Klasse after coming 15th.

On 1 August 1997, the club merged with Sportverein 1929 Daglfing to create SV Helios Daglfing München. Since 2009, SV remains active in the Kreisklasse München (IX).

== Honours ==
The club's honours:

- Kreisklasse 4 Wagner
  - Champions: 2008

== Recent seasons ==
The recent season-by-season performance of the club:

Season	Division	Tier	Position
2003–04	Kreisklasse 5 Feldhofer	IX	3rd
2004–05	Kreisklasse 4 Moossmann	IX	3rd
2005–06	Kreisklasse 8 Moossmann	IX	3rd
2006–07	Kreisklasse 4 Wagner	IX	7th
2007–08	Kreisklasse 4 Wagner	IX	1st ↑
2008–09	Kreisliga 3 Schmid	IX	14th ↓
2009–10	Kreisklasse 4 Wagner	X	3rd
2010–11	Kreisklasse 4 Wagner	X	6th
2011–12	Kreisklasse 4 Wagner	X	3rd
2012–13	Kreisklasse 4 Wagner	IX	2nd
2013–14	Kreisklasse 5	IX	5th
2014–15	Kreisklasse 5	IX	2nd
2015–16	Kreisklasse 5	IX	3rd
2016–17	Kreisklasse 5	IX	

- With the introduction of the Bezirksoberligas in 1988 as the new fifth tier, below the Landesligas, all leagues below dropped one tier. With the introduction of the Regionalligas in 1994 and the 3. Liga in 2008 as the new third tier, below the 2. Bundesliga, all leagues below dropped one tier. With the establishment of the Regionalliga Bayern as the new fourth tier in Bavaria in 2012 the Bayernliga was split into a northern and a southern division, the number of Landesligas expanded from three to five and the Bezirksoberligas abolished. All leagues from the Bezirksligas onwards were elevated one tier.

↑ Promoted	↓ Relegated
