= TSV Trebgast =

German football club

- Full name: Turn- und Sportverein Trebgast e.V.
- Founded: 1920
- Ground: Sportsplatz Trebgast
- Manager: Michael Stöcker
- League: Kreisklasse (IX)
- 2015–16: A-Klasse Bayreuth 7 (X), 2nd (promoted)
Home colours	Away colours

TSV Trebgast is a German association football club from the town of Trebgast, Bavaria.

== History ==
The club was established 1 July 1920 as the gymnastics club Turnverein Trebgast which quickly formed football, fistball and handball departments. Following World War II, TV joined two other local clubs to form ASV Trebgast before the club adopted their current name in 1950.

The footballers enjoyed their best seasons in the late 1970s when they played in the Amateurliga and Amateuroberliga Bayern following the capture of a title in the Landesliga Bayern-Nord in 1977. Their best result there came as a 7th-place finish in 1978, before they slipped to 15th place in 1981 and were relegated. By 1991, the club dropped out of the Landesliga altogether. Their most recent success came as a second-place finish in the Bezirksliga Oberfranken-Ost in 2002. TSV dropped as far as the A-Klasse Bayreuth (X) before promotion in 2015–16 took the club back up to the Kreisklasse.

In addition to the football side, the club has departments for Karate, hiking, women's gymnastics, shooting and carnival.

== Honours ==
The club's honours:

- Landesliga Bayern-Nord
  - Champions: 1977
  - Runners-up: 1975
- Bezirksliga Oberfranken-Ost
  - Champions: 1974
  - Runners-up: 2002

== Recent seasons ==
The recent season-by-season performance of the club:

Season	Division	Tier	Position
1999–2000	Bezirksliga Oberfranken-Ost	VII	4th
2000–01	Bezirksliga Oberfranken-Ost	VII	3rd
2001–02	Bezirksliga Oberfranken-Ost	VII	2nd ↑
2002–03	Bezirksoberliga Oberfranken	VI	12th
2003–04	Bezirksoberliga Oberfranken	VI	9th
2004–05	Bezirksoberliga Oberfranken	VI	14th ↓
2005–06	Bezirksliga Oberfranken-Ost	VII	7th
2006–07	Bezirksliga Oberfranken-Ost	VII	16th ↓
2007–08	Kreisliga Bayreuth-Kulmbach	VIII	14th ↓
2008–09	Kreisklasse Bayreuth-Kulmbach 2	X	7th
2009–10	Kreisklasse Bayreuth-Kulmbach 5	X	16th ↓
2010–11	A-Klasse Bayreuth-Kulmbach 9	XI	8th
2011–12	A-Klasse Bayreuth-Kulmbach 9	XI	6th
2012–13	A-Klasse Bayreuth-Kulmbach 6	X	7th
2013–14	A-Klasse Bayreuth 5	X	7th
2014–15	A-Klasse Bayreuth 5	X	8th
2015–16	A-lasse Bayreuth 7	X	2nd ↑
2016–17	Kreisklasse	IX	

- With the introduction of the Bezirksoberligas in 1988 as the new fifth tier, below the Landesligas, all leagues below dropped one tier. With the introduction of the Regionalligas in 1994 and the 3. Liga in 2008 as the new third tier, below the 2. Bundesliga, all leagues below dropped one tier. With the establishment of the Regionalliga Bayern as the new fourth tier in Bavaria in 2012 the Bayernliga was split into a northern and a southern division, the number of Landesligas expanded from three to five and the Bezirksoberligas abolished. All leagues from the Bezirksligas onward were elevated one tier.

↑ Promoted	↓ Relegated
