= SpVgg Landshut =

German football club

- Full name: SpVgg Landshut 1919 e.V.
- Nickname: Spiele
- Founded: 1919
- Ground: ebmpapststadion
- Capacity: 8150
- Chairman: Sebastian Schwarz
- Manager: Florian Baumgartl
- League: Men: Bayernliga Süd (V); Women: Landsliga Bayern-Süd (IV)
Home colours	Away colours

The SpVgg Landshut is a German association football club from the city of Landshut, Bavaria. Both the clubs men and women's football teams have in the past played in the highest state league, the Bayernliga.

== History ==
The club was formed in 1919, after the end of the First World War. However, football was already played at this stage in the football departments of the MTV and TV 1861 Landshut. In the early days of the SpVgg, the club was associated with the later, functioning as its football department.

The club made a brief appearance in the Bezirksliga Bayern (I) in 1932–33, just before this league was dissolved in favour of the new Gauliga Bayern in 1933. It was to be the only top-flight appearance for the SpVgg Landshut in its history.

After the Second World War, the SpVgg originally played in the Bezirksliga Niederbayern, a local amateur league in Lower Bavaria. The SpVgg achieved promotion to the Landesliga Bayern in 1948, then the second tier of the league system, below the Oberliga Süd. The league was renamed Amateurliga Bayern in 1950 and became the third tier of the league system. Landshut originally performed reasonably well in the league but declined from 1952 to the point where they were only saved from relegation in 1953 by the split of the league into a northern and a southern division.

The club became part of the Amateurliga Südbayern for the 1953–54 season but its decline continued and it was relegated straight away.

The team continued its existence in the 2. Amateurliga Niederbayern, below the Bayernliga, until 1960, when they gained promotion back to the highest Bavarian league. The next three seasons, the club spent in mid-table, until 1963, when the German football league system was reformed and the Amateurliga Bayern went back to a single-division format.

Below the Bayernliga, three Landesligas were set up and Landshut entered the Landesliga Bayern-Mitte (IV). Until 1968, the club finished generally in the upper half of the table, but in 1968–69, it was relegated to the Bezirksliga, where it played for one season before bouncing back. In 1972–73, it was once more relegated. It returned for one season to the Landesliga in 1977–78, played in the Bezirksliga the season after and finally earned promotion back to the Landesliga in 1979, ending their last stay in the Bezirksliga to date.

After two seasons of mid-table finishes, the club earned the right to enter the Oberliga promotion round through a second-place finish in 1981–82, where it succeeded and returned to the Bayernliga. Landshut remained an unremarkable side in its next seven seasons in this league, except for 1985–86. It also qualified for the 1981–82 DFB-Pokal, losing at home to third division side FV Hassia Bingen, 2–3.

The greatest success for the club came in 1986, when, under coach Karsten Wettberg, the title in the Bayernliga was won. This would have entitled the club to take part in the promotion round for the 2. Bundesliga but for financial reasons, the SpVgg declined to apply for a licence and the TSV 1860 Munich took part instead. The club entered the German amateur football championship instead, usually reserved for Oberliga runners-up, and reached the semi-finals before being knocked out by the VfR Bürstadt.

A second highlight in the club's history was the 1988–89 DFB-Pokal, which they qualified for. Beating BVL 08 Remscheid 2–3 away, the team advanced to the second round. This was followed by a narrow defeat to Alemannia Aachen, 1–2, this time in Landshut.

After this, the club struggled against relegation in the following seasons and dropped down in 1989. After three seasons in the Landesliga, the club once more returned to the Oberliga on the strength of a runners-up spot in its league. Another eight seasons in the Bayernliga followed, a fifth place in 1994 being the highlight. In 2000, the club was relegated once more.

Qualified for the German Cup for a third time, the SpVgg hosted Hansa Rostock in 1999–2000. Again the club performed well, losing only 0–2 against the Bundesliga side.

Like in the previous two decades, the year ending with 2 meant a second-place finish for the club but this time they failed in the promotion round. The season after, the club won the Landesliga for the first time and returned to the Oberliga, for one season, dropping down immediately again.

In the 2011–12 season the team won the Landesliga and earned the right to take part in the promotion round to the new Regionalliga Bayern. While the club was knocked out in the first round by SV Heimstetten it nevertheless qualified for an expanded Bayernliga from 2012. The club finished on a relegation play-off rank in the 2014–15 season and, after losing to SV Erlbach in the first round, was relegated back to the Landesliga.

== Honours ==
The club's honours:

=== Men ===
==== League ====
- Bayernliga (III)
  - Champions: 1986
- Landesliga Bayern-Mitte
  - Champions: 2003, 2012
  - Runners-up: (3) 1982, 1992, 2002
- 2. Amateurliga Niederbayern (IV)
  - Champions: 1960
- Bezirksliga Niederbayern (V)
  - Champions: 1970
- Bezirksliga Niederbayern-West (V)
  - Champions: 1977

==== Cup ====
- Bavarian Cup
  - Runners-up: 1999
- Niederbayern Cup
  - Winners: (14) 1949, 1969, 1981, 1986, 1987, 1988, 1991, 1995, 1999, 2001, 2002, 2004, 2006, 2008

==== Youth ====
- Bavarian Under 15 championship
  - Runners-up: (2) 1989, 1991

=== Women ===
==== League ====
- Frauen-Landesliga Süd (IV)
  - Champions: 2005

== Recent seasons ==
The recent season-by-season performance of the club:

Season	Division	Tier	Position
1985–86	Bayernliga	III	1st
1986–87	Bayernliga	III	11th
1987–88	Bayernliga	III	11th
1988–89	Bayernliga	III	15th ↓
1989–90	Landesliga Bayern-Mitte	IV	5th
1990–91	Landesliga Bayern-Mitte	IV	7th
1991–92	Landesliga Bayern-Mitte	IV	2nd ↑
1992–93	Bayernliga	III	12th
1993–94	Bayernliga	III	5th
1994–95	Bayernliga	IV	7th
1995–96	Bayernliga	IV	14th
1996–97	Bayernliga	IV	10th
1997–98	Bayernliga	IV	9th
1998–99	Bayernliga	IV	10th
1999–2000	Bayernliga	IV	16th ↓
2000–01	Landesliga Bayern-Mitte	V	4th

Season	Division	Tier	Position
2001–02	Landesliga Bayern-Mitte	V	2nd
2002–03	Landesliga Bayern-Mitte	V	1st ↑
2003–04	Bayernliga	IV	18th ↓
2004–05	Landesliga Bayern-Mitte	V	3rd
2005–06	Landesliga Bayern-Mitte	V	4th
2006–07	Landesliga Bayern-Mitte	V	5th
2007–08	Landesliga Bayern-Mitte	V	4th
2008–09	Landesliga Bayern-Mitte	VI	2nd
2009–10	Landesliga Bayern-Mitte	VI	4th
2010–11	Landesliga Bayern-Mitte	VI	3rd
2011–12	Landesliga Bayern-Mitte	VI	1st ↑
2012–13	Bayernliga Süd	V	4th
2013–14	Bayernliga Süd	V	13th
2014–15	Bayernliga Süd	V	16th ↓
2015–16	Landesliga Bayern-Südost	VI	10th
2016–17	Landesliga Bayern-Südost	VI	

- With the introduction of the Bezirksoberligas in 1988 as the new fifth tier, below the Landesligas, all leagues below dropped one tier. With the introduction of the Regionalligas in 1994 and the 3. Liga in 2008 as the new third tier, below the 2. Bundesliga, all leagues below dropped one tier. With the establishment of the Regionalliga Bayern as the new fourth tier in Bavaria in 2012 the Bayernliga was split into a northern and a southern division, the number of Landesligas expanded from three to five and the Bezirksoberligas abolished. All leagues from the Bezirksligas onwards were elevated one tier.

↑ Promoted	↓ Relegated

== Stadium ==
The club originally played in the Flutmulde, a flood plain near the Isar river. After floods destroyed the playing fields there in 1920, the club moved to Grieserwiese, where they could engage the FC Bayern Munich for its opening game, which Landshut won 4–2.

In October 1921, the SpVgg begun building a new ground at Hammerbach, which was to become their current stadium, the Hammerbachstadion. It holds 10,000 spectators and has 2,018 seats.

== DFB-Pokal appearances ==
The club has qualified for the first round of the DFB-Pokal three times:

Season	Round	Date	Home	Away	Result	Attendance
1981–82 DFB-Pokal	First round	28 August 1981	SpVgg Landshut	FV Hassia Bingen	2–3	
1988–89 DFB-Pokal	First round	6 August 1988	BVL 08 Remscheid	SpVgg Landshut	2–3	
1988–89 DFB-Pokal	Second round	14 September 1988	SpVgg Landshut	Alemannia Aachen	1–2	
1999–2000 DFB-Pokal	First round	bye				
1999–2000 DFB-Pokal	Second round	7 August 1999	SpVgg Landshut	Hansa Rostock	0–2	
