= VfB Helmbrechts =

German football club

- Full name: Verein für Bewgungsspiele Helmbrechts 98 e.V.
- Founded: 3 March 1921
- Ground: Frankenwaldsportstätte
- Capacity: 14,000
- Chairman: Rudi Rau
- Manager: Marco Bogdanovic
- League: Kreisliga Hof (VIII)
- 2015–16: Kreisklasse Hof-West (IX), 1st (promoted)
| Home colours | Away colours |

The VfB Helmbrechts is a German association football club from the city of Helmbrechts, Bavaria.

The club's most notable era was when it was playing in the 2nd Oberliga Süd, then the second tier of the German football league system, from 1955 to 1963.

== History ==
=== 1921 to 1945 ===
The club was formed on 3 March 1921, and played its first game of football one month later. VfB did not have a proper ground until 1924 and competitive matches were rare in the early years. It won the local C-Klasse championship that year and earned promotion to the B-Klasse. The following season, the B-Klasse championship could be won and the VfB moved up to the A-Klasse.

After a number of attempts, Helmbrechts won the A-Klasse championship in 1931 and earned promotion to the tier-two Kreisliga, where it played against well-known local sides like SpVgg Weiden and FC Bayern Hof.

With the rise of the Nazis to power, league football in Germany was restructured in 1933. In Bavaria, the Gauliga Bayern was introduced with the Bezirksligas as the leagues below. Helmbrechts earned promotion to this league in 1934. In this league, the club performed well, earning upper table finishes until 1939. With the outbreak of the Second World War, VfB ceased to compete in league football.

=== 1945 to 1998 ===
The club restarted its football life in the local third division in 1946, earning a championship there and promotion to the tier-two Landesliga Bayern. After one season there, it had to step down once more. The club failed in promotion round in 1951, to return to what had now become the Amateurliga Bayern but, in 1953, the expansion of the league to two regional divisions allowed the club to return.

As a new club in the Amateurliga Nordbayern, VfB took out the championship straight away in 1954–55, also winning the Bavarian championship when beating southern champions FC Penzberg, and earned the right to compete for promotion to the 2nd Oberliga Süd. In a group with Borussia Fulda and Amicitia Viernheim, it won promotion finishing first, moving up alongside FC Penzberg, SpVgg Neu-Isenburg and VfR Heilbronn.

Its first four seasons in the second division proved a tough time for the VfB, living under permanent relegation threat. In 1956, only one point saved the club; the other years were not as desperate. In 1959, 12,000 spectators turn up to see the local derby against Bayern Hof, a 3–2 victory for Helmbrechts. The 1959–60 season saw the best performance by the club in its eight 2nd Oberliga years. At the winter break, it led the league, but in the end it fell two points short of Jahn Regensburg in second place and finished fourth. This season remained a unique experience for the club, the following one saw only a mid-table finish. In 1961–62, it escaped relegation by two points once more.

Changes to the German league system in 1963, the introduction of the Fußball-Bundesliga and the Regionalligas below meant, VfB would have had to finish ninth or better to retain its second division status. This mark was missed by two points in eleventh place and the club had to return to the now single-division again Amateurliga Bayern.

Upon return to the Amateurliga, Helmbrechts had a good first year, finishing fourth. The second season wasn't quite as good with only a seventh place and from then on the club resided in the lower half of the table. By 1971, after six difficult years, VfB suffered relegation to the tier-four Landesliga Bayern-Nord.

In the Landesliga, Helmbrechts slowly worked its way up, finishing fourth in 1972, third in 1973 and second in 1971, but only the league champion was eligible for promotion at that time. After this, results dropped off but the club remained an upper table side in this league, finally winning a championship and promotion back to what was now the Oberliga Bayern in 1979.

Back in Bavarias highest league, 6,300 spectators saw the derby against Bayern Hof, a 1–1 draw. VfB experienced a couple of good Oberliga years with a sixth place in 1982 the highlight but in 1983, the club was relegated back to the Landesliga once more. After a third place in 1984, four second places followed in a row from 1985 to 1988 but the team failed each of those four years in the promotion round. The club terminated this unique achievement by winning the league in 1988–89 and earning direct promotion.

VfB lasted for only two seasons in the Bayernliga before having to return to the Landesliga in 1991. After a disappointing eight place in 1992, 1993 saw another Landesliga title and promotion. The club remained in the Oberliga Bayern for the next four seasons without being able to break through to the upper half of the table. The 1996–97 season became the club's last in the upper reaches of Bavarian amateur football. Financially troubled, the club finished last in the league, 23 points clear of a non-relegation rank. VfB decided at the end of the season, not to take up its spot in the Landesliga for the next season but instead to play in the A-Klasse (VIII) where its reserve side played in 1996–97.

=== Insolvency ===
In 1998, the VfB had to declare insolvency but a new VfB Helmbrechts club was immediately formed, adopting the 98 to its name in reference to its rebirth.

The club made a quick on-the-field recovery, earning promotion to the Bezirksliga Oberfranken Ost (VII) in 2000. After a number of average seasons in this league, it took out the championship in 2004 and earned promotion to the Bezirksoberliga Oberfranken. From this league, after initially achieving good results, the club was relegated again in 2008.

In 2008–09, the club played in the tier-eight Bezirksliga Oberfranken Ost, suffering another relegation, now to the Kreisliga. At this level, in 2009–10, the club was yet again relegated, now to the tier-ten Kreisklasse Frankenwald. After two seasons the club started to make a recovery, winning a league championship in 2012 and being promoted back to the Kreisliga from where it dropped back to the Kreisklasse in 2014. After a Kreisklasse championship in 2015–16 the club returned to the Kreisliga.

== Honours ==
=== League ===
- Amateurliga Nordbayern (III)
  - Champions: 1955
- Kreisklasse Oberfranken (III)
  - Champions: 1934
- Landesliga Bayern-Nord (IV)
  - Champions: (3) 1979, 1989, 1993
  - Runners-up: (5) 1974, 1985, 1986, 1987, 1988
- 2nd Amateurliga Oberfranken Ost (IV)
  - Champions: (2) 1951, 1953
- A-Klasse (III)
  - Champions: 1931
- B-Klasse (IV)
  - Champions: 1925
- C-Klasse (V)
  - Champions: 1924
- Bezirksliga Oberfranken Ost (VII)
  - Champions: 2004
- Kreisklasse Frankenwald
  - Champions: 2012
- Kreisklasse Hof-West
  - Champions: 2016

== Recent seasons ==
The recent season-by-season performance of the club:

| Season | Division | Tier | Position |
|---|---|---|---|
| 2000–01 | Bezirksliga Oberfranken Ost | VII | 6th |
| 2001–02 | Bezirksliga Oberfranken Ost | VII | 8th |
| 2002–03 | Bezirksliga Oberfranken Ost | VII | 4th |
| 2003–04 | Bezirksliga Oberfranken Ost | VII | 1st ↑ |
| 2004–05 | Bezirksoberliga Oberfranken | VI | 4th |
| 2005–06 | Bezirksoberliga Oberfranken | VI | 7th |
| 2006–07 | Bezirksoberliga Oberfranken | VI | 11th |
| 2007–08 | Bezirksoberliga Oberfranken | VI | 16th ↓ |
| 2008–09 | Bezirksliga Oberfranken Ost | VIII | 15th ↓ |
| 2009–10 | Kreisliga Hof | IX | 13th ↓ |
| 2010–11 | Kreisklasse Frankenwald | X | 2nd |
| 2011–12 | Kreisklasse Frankenwald | X | 1st ↑ |
| 2012–13 | Kreisliga Hof | VIII | 12th |
| 2013–14 | Kreisliga Hof | VIII | 10th ↓ |
| 2014–15 | Kreisklasse Hof-West | IX | 5th |
| 2015–16 | Kreisklasse Hof-West | IX | 1st ↑ |
| 2016–17 | Kreisliga Hof | VIII | |

- With the introduction of the Bezirksoberligas in 1988 as the new fifth tier, below the Landesligas, all leagues below dropped one tier. With the introduction of the Regionalligas in 1994 and the 3. Liga in 2008 as the new third tier, below the 2. Bundesliga, all leagues below dropped one tier. With the establishment of the Regionalliga Bayern as the new fourth tier in Bavaria in 2012 the Bayernliga was split into a northern and a southern division, the number of Landesligas expanded from three to five and the Bezirksoberligas abolished. All leagues from the Bezirksligas onwards were elevated one tier.

| ↑ Promoted | ↓ Relegated |
