= TSV Vestenbergsgreuth =

German football club

- Full name: Turn und Sport Verein Vestenbergsgreuth e.V.
- Nicknames: Greuth, Teekicker
- Founded: 1 February 1974
- Ground: Am Schwalbenberg
- Capacity: 6,000
- Chairman: Helmut Lottes
- Manager: Christian Nagengast
- League: A-Klasse (X)
- 2025–26: Kreisklasse Erlangen/Pegnitzgrund 2, 10th of 12 (relegated)
Home colours	Away colours

TSV Vestenbergsgreuth is a German association football club from the village of Vestenbergsgreuth, Franconia. From 1996 to 2007, the club did not field a team due to a merger with SpVgg Fürth, but has since returned to competitive football as a separate side.

TSV is best known for its 1–0 victory over FC Bayern Munich in the opening round of the 1994–95 DFB-Pokal, which eliminated that club from cup play just three months after they had claimed the Bundesliga title.

== History ==
=== Beginnings ===
Formed on 1 February 1974 in the small village of Vestenbergsgreuth, the club entered the local C-Klasse Bamberg Gruppe 3 (VIII), then the lowest division in the region. Greuth was an immediate success in the league, winning it unbeaten and earning the right to play against FC Wacker Trailsdorf for promotion, a game which was won 2–1 in front of 2,000 spectators.

=== Rise ===
The season after, the club took out the league championship again, now in the B-Klasse Bamberg Gruppe 3 (VII) and was promoted once more. However, it did suffer a couple of first league defeats. At the beginning of the next season, the club opened its current ground on 1 August 1976 with a friendly against SpVgg Fürth, which ended in a 1–1 draw.

In the A-Klasse Erlangen-Forchheim (VI) in 1976–77, the club's rise came to a brief halt when it "only" finished fourth. By leaving the Bamberg region for Erlangen, the club had also made the transition from the Oberfranken FA to the Mittelfranken FA. The season after, it missed out on the title by one point, finishing second. In its third attempt, Greuth then won the league in 1978–79 and earned promotion to the Bezirksliga Mittelfranken-Nord (V). In an unusual friendly, the club played a football match against the ice hockey team of CSKA Moscow and lost 1–2.

The Bezirksliga proved to be less of a hindrance to the club's rise than the A-Klasse was and it won the league in its first season there. It also remained unbeaten during the regular season but then lost the first promotion decider to TuS Feuchtwangen 1–2, in front of 4,000 spectators. In the second decider however, now against TSV Lindberg, the club managed to win 4–2 and earn promotion to the Landesliga Bayern-Mitte (IV).

=== Landesliga years ===
The Landesliga proved more difficult than the Bezirksliga and the club ended up on ninth rank in midfield, on level points, a new situation for the team. The following season saw a decline in performance and the team could only finish twelfth but the formation of a youth team was a positive development for the club. Greuth started to become a fixture in the mid- to lower-table ranks of the Landesliga, even having to survive a relegation match against ASV Herzogenaurach (5–3 after penalties for TSV) in 1984, until in 1984–85, some progress could be made with a fourth spot. The next season, the team improved by a spot and also won the local Middle Franconian Cup (German: Mittelfranken Pokal) with a 1–0 victory over 1. FC Nürnberg II. It missed out on qualifying for the German Cup when losing 1–3 to FC Augsburg on state level.

The 1986–87 season became the highlight of the club's history so far. Winning the Landesliga championship and therefore earning promotion to the Amateur Oberliga Bayern (III), the highest league in the state of Bavaria, the team managed to win all 17 of its home games. Greuth also won the Mittelfranken Cup again, through a 2–1 victory in extra time against Südwest Nürnberg. This time, on state level, it succeeded, too, beating FC Bayern Hof 2–0 and earning the right to play in the 1987–88 DFB-Pokal.

=== Bayernliga years ===
The club's first appearance in the German Cup was a short one, a 0–4 defeat against SV Darmstadt 98 of the 2. Bundesliga ended its progress. In the Bayernliga, Vestenbergsgreuth continued its amazing performance, taking the league by surprise. The club's unbeaten series at home came to an end on 12 December 1987 when a 0–1 defeat to SpVgg Unterhaching ended 26-month of being unbeaten at home. Unterhaching was also the team, that Greuth came second to in its first year in the third division. Through this, the club qualified for the German amateur football championship, where it reached the semi-finals before being knocked out by the VfB Oldenburg.

In its second year in the league, the team came third but managed to take out the Mittelfranken Cup for a third time, with a 1–0 after extra time over the Spvgg Fürth. The team however failed to reach the German Cup again, being knocked out by the SpVgg Plattling in the state finals. With a fourth place in the Bayernliga and a lost Mittelfranken Cup final, to Fürth, the next season was a little less successful. In 1990–91, the team dropped to a tenth place and again lost the cup final to Fürth.

The 1991–92 season became something of a repeat of 1987–88. Again, the club finished runners-up to SpVgg Unterhaching and again it played in the German amateur championship. Two wins, a draw and a loss meant, the team failed to reach the final. On the positive side, the club's under-19 side achieved promotion to the A-Jugend Bayernliga Nord, the highest league at this level, where it was able to measure itself on the youth side of the 1. FC Nürnberg. The year after, the club finished fourth in the league again, which was important because the 1992, 1993 and 1994 placings were what counted to qualify for the new Regionalliga Süd, which was to start in 1994.

In its last Bayernliga year to-date, the club finished only eighth but it proved to be enough to gain one of the six available spots to the Regionalliga for 1994–95. Another Cup win, 6–2 against the SpVgg Ansbach, followed by a win over Schwaben Cup winner SC Altenmünster, meant qualification to the 1994–95 DFB-Pokal.

=== Regionalliga years ===
==== The Cup game ====
On 14 August 1994, in the first round of the German Cup, the club shot to fame: Beating the German champions FC Bayern Munich 1–0 in the Frankenstadion in Nuremberg, the goal having been scored by Roland Stein. It was Bayern's first competitive match under new manager Giovanni Trapattoni and one of the greatest upsets in German Cup history. Bayern had to "live with the humiliation", as Lothar Matthäus put it and, apart from making front page in Germany and Italy, like in the Gazzetta dello Sport, even a memorial stone was erected. For Bayern, it was not the first lapse either, the club had already lost to the amateurs of FV Weinheim in 1990 and in later years lost to 1. FC Magdeburg, too. Rumor has it that, when FSV Erlangen-Bruck shortly after knocked out Greuth from the Mittelfranken Cup, Uli Hoeneß send a telegram to the Erlangen club, congratulating them.

Greuth marched on to the second round, beating FC Homburg there and finally lost to VfL Wolfsburg in the third round in a penalty shoot out.

As a footnote, the club came fifth in the new Regionalliga.

==== Last season ====
The 1995–96 season was the last for the club in competitive football, for the time, finishing in a respectable sixth place. From there, the club went into a merger with the SpVgg Fürth, which had been decided upon in 1995 for financial reasons, to form SpVgg Greuther Fürth, the Greuther in the new name reflecting the TSV Vestenbergsgreuth heritage. The new logo included the wooden shoe from the Vestenbergsgreuth logo to also indicate that the new club was more than just a continuation of Fürth. The new club managed to finish second in the Regionalliga and earn promotion to the 2nd Bundesliga.

=== Revival ===
In 2007, the club decided to field a senior side again. Doing so, the club had to enter the lowest local league, which was now the A-Klasse Erlangen/Pegnitzgrund-Gruppe 3 (X). It won, in club tradition, a championship and promotion in its first season. In this league, it met another Bavarian club who had seen better days, the ASV Herzogenaurach.

Since 2008 the club has played in the Kreisklasse Erlangen/Pegnitzgrund 2, now the ninth tier of the Bavarian football league system.

== Honours ==
The club's honours:

=== League ===
- Amateur Oberliga Bayern (III)
  - Runners-up: (2) 1988, 1992
- Landesliga Bayern-Mitte (IV)
  - Champions: 1987
- Bezirksliga Mittelfranken-Nord (V)
  - Champions: 1980
- A-Klasse Erlangen-Forchheim (VI)
  - Champions: 1979
- B-Klasse Bamberg Gruppe 3 (VII)
  - Champions: 1976
- C-Klasse Bamberg Gruppe 3 (VIII)
  - Champions: 1975
- A-Klasse Erlangen/Pegnitzgrund-Gruppe 3 (X)
  - Champions: 2008

=== Cup ===
- Mittelfranken Cup
  - Winners: (4) 1986, 1987, 1989, 1994
  - Runners-up: (2) 1990, 1991

=== Indoor ===
- Bavarian indoor championship
  - Winners: 1993

== Managers ==
Former managers of the club until 1996:

- Norbert Klaus, Alfons Scharold: 1974–75
- Hans Klever: 1975
- Herbert Graf: 1976
- Heiner Vitzethum: 8/1976 – 6/1983
- Heinz Keck: 7/1983 – 2/1991
- Rudi Sturz: 2/1991 – 5/1991
- Paul Hesselbach: 7/1991 – 6/1993
- Hubert Müller: 7/1993 – 4/1994
- Paul Hesselbach: 4/1994 – 6/1996

== Chairmen ==
The club had only two chairmen up until the merger in 1996:

- Gerhard Kilian: 1 February 1974 – 23 October 1984
- Helmut Hack: 23 October 1984 – 13 May 1997
- Helmut Lottes: current

== Nicknames ==
While Greuth is an abbreviation Vestenbergsgreuth and quite easy to understand in its origins, the second nickname needs some explanation. Teekicker (English: tea kicker) derives from the fact that the club was financially strongly supported by a local tea retailing company, run by Hans Wedel, a founding member of the club. For a while, the company sold a special "1–0 Tea" after the cup victory.

== Support ==
Considering the small size of the village of Vestenbergsgreuth (population: 1,627), the club was well supported with the following league attendance averages in its final seasons:

Year	Division	Attendance
1987–88	Amateur Oberliga	2,140
1988–89	Amateur Oberliga	1,990
1989–90	Amateur Oberliga	1,530
1990–91	Amateur Oberliga	1,561
1991–92	Amateur Oberliga	1,751
1992–93	Amateur Oberliga	
1993–94	Amateur Oberliga	847
1994–95	Regionalliga	1,144
1995–96	Regionalliga	570

- Source: Oberliga/Regionalliga Yearbooks 1987 – 1996, publisher: DSFS

== Recent seasons ==
The recent season-by-season performance of the club:

Season	Division	Tier	Position
1974–75	C-Klasse Bamberg Gruppe 3	VIII	1st ↑
1975–76	B-Klasse Bamberg Gruppe 3	VII	1st ↑
1976–77	A-Klasse Erlangen-Forchheim	VI	4th
1977–78	A-Klasse Erlangen-Forchheim	VI	2nd
1978–79	A-Klasse Erlangen-Forchheim	VI	1st ↑
1979–80	Bezirksliga Mittelfranken-Nord	V	1st ↑
1980–81	Landesliga Bayern-Mitte	IV	9th
1981–82	Landesliga Bayern-Mitte	IV	12th
1982–83	Landesliga Bayern-Mitte	IV	10th
1983–84	Landesliga Bayern-Mitte	IV	12th
1984–85	Landesliga Bayern-Mitte	IV	4th
1985–86	Landesliga Bayern-Mitte	IV	3rd
1986–87	Landesliga Bayern-Mitte	IV	1st ↑
1987–88	Amateur Oberliga Bayern	III	2nd
1988–89	Amateur Oberliga Bayern	III	3rd
1989–90	Amateur Oberliga Bayern	III	4th
1990–91	Amateur Oberliga Bayern	III	10th
1991–92	Amateur Oberliga Bayern	III	2nd
1992–93	Amateur Oberliga Bayern	III	4th
1993–94	Amateur Oberliga Bayern	III	8th ↑
1994–95	Regionalliga Süd	III	5th
1995–96	Regionalliga Süd	III	6th

Season	Division	Tier	Position
1996–2007	did not compete		
2007–08	A-Klasse Erlangen/Pegnitzgrund-Gruppe 3	X	1st ↑
2008–09	Kreisklasse Erlangen/Pegnitzgrund 2	X	5th
2009–10	Kreisklasse Erlangen/Pegnitzgrund 2	X	6th
2010–11	Kreisklasse Erlangen/Pegnitzgrund 2	X	3rd
2011–12	Kreisklasse Erlangen/Pegnitzgrund 2	X	3rd
2012–13	Kreisklasse Erlangen/Pegnitzgrund 1	IX	7th
2013–14	Kreisklasse Erlangen/Pegnitzgrund 1	IX	4th
2014–15	Kreisklasse Erlangen/Pegnitzgrund 1	IX	6th
2015–16	Kreisklasse Erlangen/Pegnitzgrund 1	IX	11th
2016–17	Kreisklasse Erlangen/Pegnitzgrund 1	IX	10th
2017–18	Kreisklasse Erlangen/Pegnitzgrund 1	IX	16th ↓
2018–19	A-Klasse Erlangen/Pegnitzgrund 1	X	6th
2019–21	A-Klasse Erlangen/Pegnitzgrund 1	X	6th
2021–22	A-Klasse Erlangen/Pegnitzgrund 2	X	2nd ↑
2022–23	Kreisklasse Erlangen/Pegnitzgrund 1	IX	7th
2023–24	Kreisklasse Erlangen/Pegnitzgrund 1	IX	8th
2024–25	Kreisklasse Erlangen/Pegnitzgrund 1	IX	8th
2025–26	Kreisklasse Erlangen/Pegnitzgrund 1	IX	10th ↓
2026–27	A-Klasse Erlangen/Pegnitzgrund 1	X	

- With the introduction of the Bezirksoberligas in 1988 as the new fifth tier, below the Landesligas, all leagues below dropped one tier. With the introduction of the Regionalligas in 1994 and the 3. Liga in 2008 as the new third tier, below the 2. Bundesliga, all leagues below dropped one tier. With the establishment of the Regionalliga Bayern as the new fourth tier in Bavaria in 2012 the Bayernliga was split into a northern and a southern division, the number of Landesligas expanded from three to five and the Bezirksoberligas abolished. All leagues from the Bezirksligas onward were elevated one tier.

↑ Promoted	↓ Relegated

== DFB-Pokal appearances ==
The club has qualified for the first round of the German Cup a number of times:

Season	Round	Date	Home	Away	Result	Attendance
1987–88 DFB-Pokal	First round	28 August 1987	TSV Vestenbergsgreuth	SV Darmstadt 98	0–4	5,500
1994–95 DFB-Pokal	First round	14 August 1994	TSV Vestenbergsgreuth	FC Bayern Munich	1–0	24,200
1994–95 DFB-Pokal	Second round	10 September 1994	TSV Vestenbergsgreuth	FC Homburg	5–1	3,200
1994–95 DFB-Pokal	Third round	25 October 1994	TSV Vestenbergsgreuth	VfL Wolfsburg	1–1 / 3–4 after pen.	5,500
