= ASV Herzogenaurach =

German football club

- Full name: Allgemeiner Sportverein Herzogenaurach e.V.
- Founded: 1919
- Ground: ASV Sportplatz
- Chairman: Elke Sowa
- Manager: Dieter Hacker
- League: A-Klasse Erlangen/Pegnitzgrund (X)
- 2018–19: B-Klasse Erlangen/Pegnitzgrund (XI), 2nd (promoted)
Home colours	Away colours

The ASV Herzogenaurach is a German association football club from Herzogenaurach, a suburb of the city of Nuremberg, Bavaria.

The history of the club is strongly intertwined with the local sports equipment manufacturer Adidas, then just a local company and sponsor of the ASV and its rivalry to 1. FC Herzogenaurach, which was sponsored by another local company, Puma.

== History ==
=== Early years ===
Formed in 1919 under the name Sportclub Pfeil, it changed its name to Freie Union and later, after the Second World War, to ASV Herzogenaurach. During the Nazi era, the club was outlawed and disbanded due to its unionist and working-class background.

=== Rise ===
The club existed as a local amateur side until the mid-1960s, when a championship in the A-Klasse Mittelfranken-Gruppe 3 (VI) in 1966 earned it promotion to the Bezirksliga Mittelfranken-Nord (V). Another promotion followed in 1968, after a championship in the Bezirksliga. Entering the Landesliga Bayern-Mitte for the 1968–69 season, the club was offered a sponsorship by the Puma AG. Seeing an opportunity to gain wider recognition, Adidas however moved in instead, becoming the main sponsor of the club. Puma was already since November 1967 a sponsor of the clubs local rival, the FC Herzogenaurach. The rivalry between Puma and Adidas, which is in truth the rivalry of the two brothers who owned the companies then, Rudolf Dassler and Adolf Dassler, predates the rivalry of the two football clubs, stretching back to 1948.

Through the influence of Adidas, the club managed to gain the current German champion, FC Bayern Munich, for a friendly, which was played on 23 July 1969 in front of 6,000 spectators, a 1–9 defeat for the ASV.

In the Landesliga, the club met its local rival once more, the FCH having earned promotion to the league in 1966. The first season there together, ASV finished fourth while the FC came third, the clubs being separated by one point. The season after, the FC won the league and earned promotion to the Amateurliga Bayern (III) while the ASV came third. The ASV had to wait another two seasons to do the same and win the league and promotion in 1972.

=== Bayernliga years ===
While the FC had enjoyed two good seasons in the highest league in the state, it did not so well when the ASV joined it there and with a third place in 1972–73, the Adidas-club finished above the Puma-team for the first time in years.

The 1973–74 season became the most successful for the club to date. It won the Amateurliga Bayern title while its local rival found itself relegated from the league. Due to a restructuring of the German football league system however, the five Regionalligas were replaced by the two 2. Bundesligas, no promotion from the third to the second tier was available that season. The right to play in the German amateur football championship instead was only a small consolation and the club was knocked-out by the SSV Reutlingen in the quarter-finals.

The club managed to attract the FC Bayern Munich for another friendly however and on 29 July 1974, 7,000 spectators saw the Bavarian champion earn a 2–2 draw against Bavaria's most successful club.

The 1974–75 season saw another respectable performance, finishing fourth in the league. After this, the club went into decline, having to play against relegation, which became a fact in 1977, the year its local rival FC earned its return to the Amateurliga Bayern. While the FCH managed to stay in Bavaria's highest amateur league until 1981, the ASV could not achieve to return to it. Instead, it was left with a large debt from its Bayernliga years and hoped to finally pay off the last of it in 2008.

The late 1970s also saw the rise of two promising young footballers in Herzogenaurach who went to school together. Günter Güttler, who played for the ASV and later joined FC Bayern Munich and Lothar Matthäus, who played for the FC and became Germany's most capped footballer. Matthäus could not play for the ASV even though it had at that time the better under-19's side, because his father worked for Puma.

=== Decline ===
Back in the Landesliga Bayern-Mitte, the ASV tried hard to regain Amateurliga Bayern status, finishing second three times in a row in 1978, 1979 and 1980. The first two times, it missed out on top-spot by only one point, in 1979 to local rival FC. After this, the club declined further and was never in contention for the Landesliga title again. The FC didn't fare much better, fluctuating between Landesliga and Bezirksliga after its final relegation form the now Amateur-Oberliga Bayern in 1981. By 1989, both Herzogenaurach clubs had left the Landesliga for good.

The ASV lost its Landesliga status in 1987, when a player revolt over unpaid travel expenses made it lose its complete team and it had to field its youth side instead. The club declined rapidly and was handed down all the way to the lowest division, the C-Klasse. Sponsor Adidas had by then mostly withdrawn its support, too.

A small revival followed in 1998, when the club briefly rose to the local Kreisliga again but it could not sustain this level and was promptly relegated again.

The club played in the A-Klasse Erlangen/Pegnitzgrund (X) in 2008–09, the lowest level of play in the region, and finished third in this league in 2008–09. Its old rival the 1. FC Herzogenaurach had fallen down not quite as far in the league system, playing one level above in the Kreisliga Erlangen/Pegnitzgrund (IX) in 2008–09.

In 2009–10, ASV won its league and earned promotion to the Kreisklasse, where it met FCH once more. While its rival earned promotion in 2010–11, ASV was a distant last in the league and relegated.

The old rivalry between the two clubs may have lost some of its punch, as has the local rivalry between the two sports brands. The town of Herzogenaurach is certainly not as divided any more as it once was. In March 2007, a merger of the three local clubs was even discussed, the ASV and FC together with the SC Nord should form one club which would then be capable to reach Regionalliga level.

The rivalry of the two companies, and with it to some extent the local football club issue, gained some international attention during the 2006 FIFA World Cup in Germany, when a number of international news organisations picked up on it.

By 2014 the club had fallen to new lows, dropping to the B-Klasse Erlangen/Pegnitzgrund 1, a league where 12 out of 15 teams were reserve sides but also included another former Bayernliga club, the BSC Erlangen.

== Honours ==
=== League ===
- Amateurliga Bayern (III)
  - Champions: 1974
- Landesliga Bayern-Mitte (IV)
  - Champions: 1972
  - Runners-up: (3) 1978, 1979, 1980
- Bezirksliga Mittelfranken-Nord (V)
  - Champions: 1968
- A-Klasse Erlangen/Pegnitzgrund 2
  - Champions: 2010

== Recent seasons ==
The recent season-by-season performance of the club:

Season	Division	Tier	Position
2003–04	A-Klasse Erlangen Forchheim-Süd	X	4th ↑
2004–05	Kreisklasse West Erlangen/Forchheim	IX	14th ↓
2005–06	A-Klasse Pegnitzgrund	X	11th
2006–07	A-Klasse Erlangen/Pegnitzgrund	X	7th
2007–08	A-Klasse Erlangen/Pegnitzgrund	X	4th
2008–09	A-Klasse Erlangen/Pegnitzgrund	XI	3rd
2009–10	A-Klasse Erlangen/Pegnitzgrund 2	XI	1st ↑
2010–11	Kreisklasse Erlangen/Pegnitzgrund 1	X	15th ↓
2011–12	A-Klasse Erlangen/Pegnitzgrund 1	XI	13th
2012–13	A-Klasse Erlangen/Pegnitzgrund 2	X	7th
2013–14	A-Klasse Erlangen/Pegnitzgrund 2	X	16th ↓
2014–15	B-Klasse Erlangen/Pegnitzgrund	XI	5th
2015–16	B-Klasse Erlangen/Pegnitzgrund	XI	6th
2016–17	B-Klasse Erlangen/Pegnitzgrund	XI	2nd ↑
2017–18	A-Klasse Erlangen/Pegnitzgrund 1	X	15th ↓
2018–19	B-Klasse Erlangen/Pegnitzgrund	XI	2nd ↑

- With the introduction of the Bezirksoberligas in 1988 as the new fifth tier, below the Landesligas, all leagues below dropped one tier. With the introduction of the Regionalligas in 1994 and the 3. Liga in 2008 as the new third tier, below the 2. Bundesliga, all leagues below dropped one tier. With the establishment of the Regionalliga Bayern as the new fourth tier in Bavaria in 2012 the Bayernliga was split into a northern and a southern division, the number of Landesligas expanded from three to five and the Bezirksoberligas abolished. All leagues from the Bezirksligas onwards were elevated one tier.

↑ Promoted	↓ Relegated

== ASV versus FC ==
The Herzogenaurach derby in the Bayernliga and Landesliga:

Season	League	Teams	Home	Away
1968–69	Landesliga Bayern-Mitte	ASV Herzogenaurach – 1. FC Herzogenaurach	1–0	1–5
1969–70	Landesliga Bayern-Mitte	ASV Herzogenaurach – 1. FC Herzogenaurach	0–1	1–0
1972–73	Amateurliga Bayern	ASV Herzogenaurach – 1. FC Herzogenaurach	1–3	2–0
1973–74	Amateurliga Bayern	ASV Herzogenaurach – 1. FC Herzogenaurach	0–1	2–0
1978–79	Landesliga Bayern-Mitte	ASV Herzogenaurach – 1. FC Herzogenaurach	1–2	2–2
1981–82	Landesliga Bayern-Mitte	ASV Herzogenaurach – 1. FC Herzogenaurach	1–1	2–2
1982–83	Landesliga Bayern-Mitte	ASV Herzogenaurach – 1. FC Herzogenaurach	2–2	4–2
1984–85	Landesliga Bayern-Mitte	ASV Herzogenaurach – 1. FC Herzogenaurach	2–2	4–2

- Source: Manfreds Fussball Archiv Tables and results of the Bavarian amateur leagues

== Former players ==
The club had a couple of players in its ranks who later played in the Bundesliga, the most well-known of those being:

- Dietmar Beiersdorfer, played for Hamburger SV and Werder Bremen
- Günter Güttler, (until 1980), played for FC Bayern Munich, 1. FC Nürnberg, Waldhof Mannheim, FC Schalke 04
