= ASV Neumarkt =

German football club

- Full name: Allgemeiner Sport Verein 1860 Neumarkt e.V.
- Founded: 26 June 1860
- Ground: ASV Sportzentrum
- Capacity: 2,150
- Chairman: Jürgen Drabant
- Manager: Dominic Rühl
- League: Bayernliga Nord (V)
- 2025–26: Bayernliga Nord, 3rd of 18
Home colours	Away colours

The ASV Neumarkt is a German association football club from the town of Neumarkt, Bavaria.

The club has spent a number of seasons in the Bayernliga, the highest football league in Bavaria, the last occasion being the 2000–01 season. The club has also made three appearances in the DFB-Pokal, on each occasion going out without scoring a goal.

The town of Neumarkt is located in the Upper Palatinate but ASV has historically opted to play in the league system of neighboring Middle Franconia.

== History ==
The club was formed on 26 June 1860 as the gymnastics club TV 1860 Neumarkt. However, football was not played in Neumarkt in an organised form until 1913. In 1921, the DJK Neumarkt was formed, which soon played in the local league system. In 1922, the Fohlenhof ("foal yard") became home to the local footballers of DJK and Freie Turnerschaft and would later be the home ground of ASV until 1974, when the club moved to new facilities. From 1894 to 1922, the area had been used to train horses for the Bavarian cavalry but became surplus to requirement when, after the lost First World War, the German Army, the Reichswehr, was shrunk in size.

In 1926, first attempts were made to merge the local sport clubs into one, but efforts remained fruitless. In 1932, the first local derby was played but 1933, with the rise of the Nazis to power, brought changes to the sports clubs in Neumarkt. TV 1860 remained untouched but DJK, associated with the catholic church, was renamed Germania and the working-class Freie Turnerschaft was outlawed altogether.

With the end of the Second World War, football slowly returned to Neumarkt. The Freie Turnerschaft was reformed but merged with another club in 1947 to form TSV Neumarkt. In December 1950, TSV then merged with Germania, TV 1860 and the local ski club to form the current ASV Neumarkt. ASV did however not become a successful football side immediately; it took until the reorganisation of the German league system in 1963 for the club to enter the higher reaches of Bavarian amateur football.

ASV became a founding member of the tier-four Landesliga Bayern-Mitte in 1963 but lasted for only one season at this level, being relegated to the Bezirksliga.

After five years on the fifth level, Neumarkt returned to the Landesliga in 1969 and managed a second-place finish in its first season back, followed by a league championship the year after, which qualified the side for promotion to the Bayernliga. The club had an excellent first season at this level, too, finishing fourth, but the year after, 1972–73, ASV was relegated again.

Back in the Landesliga, the club won the league championship straight away and made an instant return to the Bayernliga. The team also managed to qualify for the DFB-Pokal for the first time in 1974, but made a first round exit away to Fortuna Düsseldorf, where the team lost 6–0. Eight seasons in the Bayernliga were to follow, the club's most successful era. In 1975–76, another fourth place was achieved and ASV was generally an upper-table side. This era however came to an end in 1982, when the side was relegated after coming second-last. Almost twenty years would pass before Neumarkt made a return to Bavaria's highest league. Before that, in 1978, ASV made its second cup appearance, going out away to 1. FC Nürnberg in a 4–0 defeat.

On return to the Landesliga, ASV was immediately relegated from there, too. The team became a member of the northern division of the tier-five Bezirksliga Mittelfranken. In 1988, the club became a founding member of the new Bezirksoberliga Mittelfranken, a league it won in 1989–90.

Back in the Landesliga, ASV's stay was short, a 15th place causing instant relegation back down. The club spent the next five seasons in the Bezirksoberliga trying to win promotion but coming third on three occasions and narrowly missing out. In 1996, another league championship finally moved the club back up. In this era, Neumarkt made its third appearance in the DFoB-Pkal 1993, when Tennis Borussia Berlin beat the club 4–0 in Neumarkt in the second round after a bye in the first.

Neumarkt was as strong a side in the Landesliga as it had been in the Bezirksoberliga and played for four seasons in the top four, finally earning its way back to the Bayernliga with its third Landesliga title in 2000. Success in the Bayernliga was much harder to achieve and the club struggled for two seasons before having to return to the Landesliga.

At the end of the 2011–12 season the club qualified directly for the newly expanded Bayernliga after finishing seventh in the Landesliga. ASV lasted at this level for two seasons before being relegated back to the Landesliga in 2014. A Landesliga championship in 2015–16 took the club back up to the Bayernliga.

== Honours ==
The club's honours:

=== League ===
- Landesliga Bayern-Nordost
  - Champions: 2016
- Landesliga Bayern-Mitte
  - Champions: (4) 1971, 1974, 2000, 2021
  - Runners-up: (2) 1970, 2005
- Bezirksoberliga Mittelfranken
  - Champions: (2) 1990, 1996
- Bezirksliga Mittelfranken-Nord
  - Champions: 1969
  - Runners-up: (2) 1987, 1988

=== Cup ===
- Mittelfranken Cup
  - Winners: 2008

== Recent seasons ==
The recent season-by-season performance of the club:

Season	Division	Tier	Position
1999–2000	Landesliga Bayern-Mitte	V	1st ↑
2000–01	Bayernliga	IV	15th
2001–02	Bayernliga	IV	19th ↓
2002–03	Landesliga Bayern-Mitte	V	3rd
2003–04	Landesliga Bayern-Mitte	V	5th
2004–05	Landesliga Bayern-Mitte	V	2nd
2005–06	Landesliga Bayern-Mitte	V	11th
2006–07	Landesliga Bayern-Mitte	V	12th
2007–08	Landesliga Bayern-Mitte	V	6th
2008–09	Landesliga Bayern-Mitte	VI	3rd
2009–10	Landesliga Bayern-Mitte	VI	13th
2010–11	Landesliga Bayern-Mitte	VI	12th
2011–12	Landesliga Bayern-Mitte	VI	7th ↑
2012–13	Bayernliga Nord	V	12th
2013–14	Bayernliga Nord	V	17th ↓
2014–15	Landesliga Bayern-Mitte	VI	3rd
2015–16	Landesliga Bayern-Nordost	VI	1st ↑
2016–17	Bayernliga Nord	V	5th
2017–18	Bayernliga Süd	V	5th
2018–19	Bayernliga Nord	V	18th ↓
2019–21	Landesliga Bayern-Mitte	VI	1st ↑
2021–22	Bayernliga Nord	V	5th
2022–23	Bayernliga Nord	V	11th
2023–24	Bayernliga Nord	V	13th

- With the introduction of the Bezirksoberligas in 1988 as the new fifth tier, below the Landesligas, all leagues below dropped one tier. With the introduction of the Regionalligas in 1994 and the 3. Liga in 2008 as the new third tier, below the 2. Bundesliga, all leagues below dropped one tier. With the establishment of the Regionalliga Bayern as the new fourth tier in Bavaria in 2012 the Bayernliga was split into a northern and a southern division, the number of Landesligas expanded from three to five and the Bezirksoberligas abolished. All leagues from the Bezirksligas onwards were elevated one tier.

↑ Promoted	↓ Relegated

== DFB Cup appearances ==
The club has qualified for the first round of the German Cup on three occasions:

Season	Round	Date	Home	Away	Result	Attendance
1974–75 DFB-Pokal	First round	7 September 1974	Fortuna Düsseldorf	ASV Neumarkt	6–0	
1978–79 DFB-Pokal	First round	4 August 1978	1. FC Nürnberg	ASV Neumarkt	4–0	
1993–94 DFB-Pokal	First round	24 August 1993	ASV Neumarkt	Tennis Borussia Berlin	0–4	
