= 2008–09 Bayernliga =

Bayernliga
- Season: 2008–09
- Champions: SpVgg Weiden
- Promoted: SpVgg Weiden
- Relegated: Würzburger FV: 1. FC Schweinfurt 05; Würzburger Kickers
- Top goalscorer: Thomas Karg (24 goals)

The 2008–09 season of the Bayernliga, the fifth tier of the German football league system in the state of Bavaria at the time, was the 64th season of the league.

== Overview ==
The league champions, SpVgg Weiden, were directly promoted to the Regionalliga Süd. It was Weiden's third Bayernliga title after 1953–54 and 1964–65 and their first promotion to Regionalliga level since the latter championship took them up for a season in 1965–66.

The bottom three clubs were directly relegated from the league while 15th placed SV Seligenporten had to enter the relegation round with the Landesliga runners-up where it successfully defended its league place. Of the relegated clubs Würzburger FV and 1. FC Schweinfurt 05 made an immediate return to the Bayernliga in the following season while Würzburger Kickers bypassed the league in 2012, earning promotion from the tier six Landesliga Bayern-Nord to the new tier four Regionalliga Bayern without playing in the Bayernliga.

Thomas Karg of VfL Frohnlach was the league's top scorer with 24 goals.

== Table ==
The 2008–09 season saw seven new clubs in the league, FSV Erlangen-Bruck, FC Ingolstadt 04 II, VfL Frohnlach, TSV Buchbach, TSV Rain am Lech, SV Seligenporten and Würzburger Kickers, all promoted from the Landesliga Bayern, while no club had been relegated from the Regionalliga Süd to the league.

For Erlangen-Bruck, Ingolstadt, Buchbach, Rain and Seligenporten it was their first-ever season in the league while Frohnlach had last played in the Bayernliga in 2007 and Würzburg in 1998.

Pos	Team	Pld	W	D	L	GF	GA	GD	Pts	Promotion, qualification or relegation
1	SpVgg Weiden (C, P)	34	22	8	4	66	29	+37	74	Promotion to Regionalliga Süd
2	TSV Aindling	34	18	11	5	69	27	+42	65	
3	FC Memmingen	34	17	8	9	48	34	+14	59	
4	SpVgg Bayreuth	34	15	10	9	48	38	+10	55	
5	FSV Erlangen-Bruck	34	13	14	7	60	44	+16	53	
6	FC Ingolstadt 04 II	34	14	10	10	50	42	+8	52	
7	VfL Frohnlach	34	12	9	13	64	56	+8	45	
8	TSV Buchbach	34	11	12	11	47	44	+3	45	
9	TSG Thannhausen	34	12	7	15	53	55	−2	43	
10	SpVgg Bayern Hof	34	11	9	14	41	45	−4	42	
11	FC Ismaning	34	12	5	17	61	60	+1	41	
12	SpVgg Ansbach	34	9	13	12	37	49	−12	40	
13	1. FC Bad Kötzting	34	10	9	15	42	65	−23	39	
14	TSV Rain am Lech (Note: TSV Rain am Lech, SV Seligenporten and Würzburger FV finished on equal points and had to play deciders to determine their final positions.)	34	10	8	16	47	67	−20	38	
15	SV Seligenporten	34	8	14	12	41	55	−14	38	Qualification to relegation playoffs
16	Würzburger FV (R)	34	8	14	12	45	52	−7	38	Relegation to Landesliga Bayern
17	FC Schweinfurt 05 (R)	34	10	6	18	39	66	−27	36	Relegation to Landesliga Bayern
18	Würzburger Kickers (R)	34	9	3	22	52	82	−30	30	Relegation to Landesliga Bayern

Source: Weltfussball.de, f-archiv.de
Rules for classification: 1) Points; 2) Decider
(C) Champions; (P) Promoted; (R) Relegated

== Bayernliga promotion round ==
The 15th placed Bayernliga team had to face the runners-up of the three Landesligas for one more place in the Bayernliga.

Date	Match			Result
Semi-finals : in Schwarzenfeld and Gerolfing
13 June 2009	1. FC Sand (Nord)	–	SpVgg Landshut (Mitte)	0–1
13 June 2009	FC Affing (Süd)	–	SV Seligenporten	0–3
Final : in Tegernheim
17 June 2009	SpVgg Landshut	–	SV Seligenporten	0–1
