= TSV Gerbrunn =

German football club

- Full name: Turn und Sport Verein 1877 Gerbrunn e.V.
- Founded: 1877
- Chairman: Thomas Beck
- Manager: Oliver Bieber
- League: A-Klasse (X)
- 2015–16: Kreisklasse Würzburg-Gruppe 1 (IX), 14th (relegated)
Home colours	Away colours

The TSV Gerbrunn is a German association football club from the municipality of Gerbrunn, Bavaria.

The club's greatest success came in 2002, when it won promotion to the tier four Bayernliga, but it lasted for only one season at this level.

== History ==
Formed in 1877 as a gymnastics club, the Turnverein Gerbrunn, for the most part of its history, existed as a lower amateur side.

The club rose to a short stint of Bavarian prominence in 1998 when it won the Bezirksoberliga Unterfranken (VI) in its first season in the league. From there it advanced to the Landesliga Bayern-Nord (V) where it finished in mid-table for the next three years.

The 2001–02 season was to become the club's greatest so far, winning the Landesliga and earning promotion to the Bayernliga (IV), the highest league in the state.

In the Bayernliga the TSV Gerbrunn found the going hard and was eventually relegated, coming last out of eighteen teams. However, the TSV won the local Unterfranken Cup, earning it the right to compete in the Bavarian Cup. In this competition, the team went all the way to the final.

Financial considerations forced the club to withdraw to the Kreisklasse Würzburg instead of entering the Landesliga for 2003–04. Due to the Bavarian Cup final being played at the beginning of the next season, the TSV found itself with a much weaker team and was sorely defeated by the TSV Aindling, 0–14. Having qualified for the German Cup by reaching the Bavarian final, the team met the SV Wacker Burghausen, where another 0–14 defeat meant a harsh end to its area of higher league football. It was only one goal off the record cup defeat of DJK Waldberg against Bayern Munich, who lost 1–16 in 1997. Five of Gerbrunn's players, including the goal keeper Stylianos Voulgaris, played in both matches.

The TSV Gerbrunn returned to local amateur league football in the Würzburg region, where it spent most of its previous history. In its first season there, 2003–04, it suffered another relegation, down to the lowest level, the A-Klasse. A last place finish with 29 loses and one draw to its name, 122 goals scored against, culminated a season that had started with the 0–14 cup los. Gerbrunn actually remained without a win for 15-month, until 29 August 2004, when it beat SV Heidingsfeld II 4–2. Its last victory before that, still in the Bayernliga, was on 11 May 2003, ironically against the TSV Aindling.

The TSV most recently played in the Kreisklasse Würzburg-Gruppe 1, the ninth division of the Bavarian league system, with a second place in 2010–11 as its best result but being relegated from the league in 2016.

== Honours ==
=== League ===
- Landesliga Bayern-Nord (V)
  - Champions: 2002
- Bezirksoberliga Unterfranken (VI)
  - Champions: 1998
- Bezirksliga Unterfranken-Mitte (VII)
  - Champions: 1997

=== Cup ===
- Bavarian Cup
  - Runners-up: 2003
- Unterfranken Cup
  - Winners: 2003

== Recent seasons ==
The recent season-by-season performance of the club:

Season	Division	Tier	Position
1998–1999	Landesliga Bayern-Nord	V	6th
1999–2000	Landesliga Bayern-Nord	V	6th
2000–01	Landesliga Bayern-Nord	V	7th
2001–02	Landesliga Bayern-Nord	V	1st ↑
2002–03	Bayernliga	IV	18th ↓
2003–04	Kreisklasse Würzburg	IX	16th ↓
2004–05	A-Klasse Würzburg-Gruppe 1	X	6th
2005–06	A-Klasse Würzburg	X	4th
2006–07	A-Klasse Würzburg-Gruppe 5	X	11th
2007–08	A-Klasse Würzburg-Gruppe 5	X	2nd ↑
2008–09	Kreisklasse Würzburg-Gruppe 1	X	9th
2009–10	Kreisklasse Würzburg-Gruppe 1	X	5th
2010–11	Kreisklasse Würzburg-Gruppe 1	X	2nd
2011–12	Kreisklasse Würzburg-Gruppe 1	X	6th
2012–13	Kreisklasse Würzburg-Gruppe 1	IX	8th
2013–14	Kreisklasse Würzburg-Gruppe 1	IX	10th
2014–15	Kreisklasse Würzburg-Gruppe 1	IX	13th
2015–16	Kreisklasse Würzburg-Gruppe 1	IX	14th ↓
2016–17	A-Klasse Würzburg	X	

- With the introduction of the Bezirksoberligas in 1988 as the new fifth tier, below the Landesligas, all leagues below dropped one tier. With the introduction of the Regionalligas in 1994 and the 3. Liga in 2008 as the new third tier, below the 2. Bundesliga, all leagues below dropped one tier. With the establishment of the Regionalliga Bayern as the new fourth tier in Bavaria in 2012 the Bayernliga was split into a northern and a southern division, the number of Landesligas expanded from three to five and the Bezirksoberligas abolished. All leagues from the Bezirksligas onwards were elevated one tier.

↑ Promoted	↓ Relegated

== DFB Cup appearances ==
The club has qualified for the first round of the German Cup only once:

- DFB Cup 2003–04

Round	Date	Home	Away	Result	Attendance
First round	30 August 2003	TSV Gerbrunn	Wacker Burghausen	0–14	815
