= Erwin Albert =

German footballer

Personal information
- Date of birth: 27 March 1954 (age 72)
- Place of birth: Germany
- Position: Forward

Senior career*
Years	Team	Apps	(Gls)
1975–1977	1. FC Haßfurt		
1977–1978	Hertha BSC	2	(0)
1978–1986	Beveren	248	(127)
1986–1990	FC Schweinfurt		

Managerial career
- 1992–1993: 1. FC Schweinfurt 05
- 1999–2007: TSV Großbardorf
- 2008–2013: 1. FC Sand
- * Club domestic league appearances and goals

Erwin Albert (born 27 March 1954) is a German retired footballer who played as a forward.

== Honours ==
K.S.K. Beveren

- Belgian First Division A: 1978–79, 1983–84
- Belgian Cup: 1982–83
- Belgian Super Cup: 1979, 1984
- European Cup Winners' Cup: semi-finalist 1978–79

1. FC Schweinfurt 05

- Bayernliga: 1989–90

Individual

- Belgian First Division A top scorer: 1978–79 (28 goals)
