= Landesliga Bayern-Nordwest =

- Founded: 2012
- Country: Germany
- State: Bavaria
- Number of clubs: 19
- Level on pyramid: Level 6
- Promotion to: Bayernliga
- Relegation to: Bezirksliga
- Current champions: 1. FC Geesdorf; (2021–22)

The Landesliga Bayern-Nordwest (English: State league Bavaria-Northwest) is currently the sixth tier of the German football league system in northwestern Bavaria and the third tier of the Bavarian football league system.

It is one of five Landesligas in Bavaria, the other four being the Landesliga Südwest, Landesliga Mitte, Landesliga Nordost and Landesliga Südost. The league champion automatically qualifies for the Bayernliga, the runner-up needs to compete with the runners-up of the other four Landesligas and a number of Bayernliga teams for another promotion spot.

The league replaced the Landesliga Bayern-Nord at this level, the former having existed from 1963 to its disbanding in 2012. The new Landesliga Nordwest covers eastern Upper Franconia and western Lower Franconia only while the old Landesliga Nord covered both regions in full.

== History ==
=== Formation ===
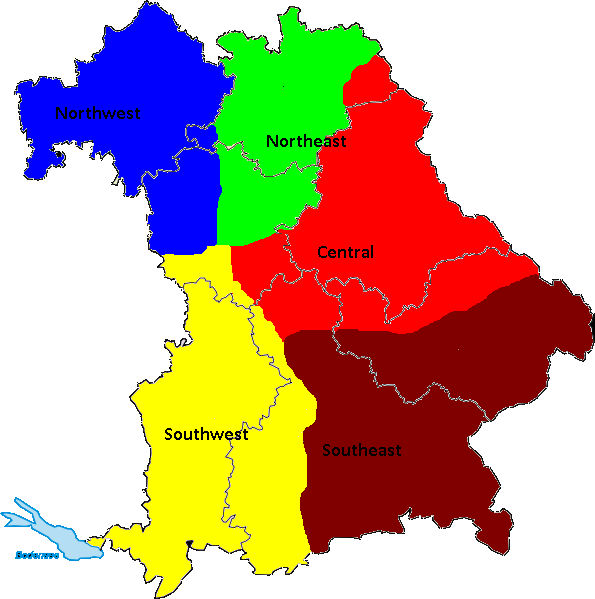
The Landesligas from 2012 onwards.

The Bavarian Football Association carried out drastic changes to the league system at the end of the 2011–12 season. With the already decided introduction of the Regionalliga Bayern from 2012 to 2013, it also placed two Bayernligas below the new league as the new fifth tier of the German league system, splitting the previously single division league into a northern and a southern group. Below those, five Landesligas instead of the existing three were set, which were geographically divided to limit travel and increase the number of local derbies.

Clubs from three different league tiers were able to qualify for the new league. From the Landesliga level, the clubs placed ninth to 15th had the opportunity to qualify for the Bayernliga through play-offs. Those clubs who failed to qualify for the Bayernliga were grouped in the Landesliga. The Landesliga clubs placed 16th, 17th and 18th automatically went to the Landesliga. The Bezirksoberliga (BOL) champions also had the chance to qualify for the Bayernliga. Those clubs who failed went to the Landesliga, alongside the BOL teams placed second to sixth. The teams placed seventh to tenth in Lower Franconia and seventh to thirteens in Upper Franconia entered a play-off with the Bezirksliga champions for the remaining Landesliga spots. The league, in its inaugural season, also included one club from Middle Franconia, the TSV Neustadt/Aisch, because of a successful protest by 1. FC Burgkunstadt, which saw the latter moved from the north-west division to the north-east and Neustadt moved the other way to compensate.

The league started out with 18 clubs in its inaugural season, the clubs coming from the following leagues:

- From the Landesliga Bayern-Nord (VI): TG Höchberg, FT Schweinfurt, FC Gerolzhofen, TuS Frammersbach, SV Pettstadt
- From the Landesliga Bayern-Mitte (VI): TSV Neustadt/Aisch
- From the Bezirksoberliga Unterfranken (VII): ASV Rimpar, TSV Karlburg, FVgg Bayern Kitzingen, FC Blau-Weiss Leinach, TSV Abtswind, TSV Bergrheinfeld, SV Erlenbach, TSV Lengfeld
- From the Bezirksoberliga Oberfranken (VII): FC Strullendorf
- From the Bezirksliga Oberfranken-West (VIII): 1. FC Oberhaid
- From the Bezirksliga Unterfranken-Gruppe 2 (VIII): SV-DJK Unterspiesheim, 1. FC Augsfeld

=== Seasons ===
The opening game of the new league took place on 18 July 2012 when TSV Neustadt/Aisch hosted FVgg Bayern Kitzingen and lost 0–2. At the end of the 2012–13 season, league champions SV Erlenbach were directly promoted while runners-up SV Pettstadt failed to earn promotion via the promotion round. At the other end of the table, TSV Bergrheinfeld, SV-DJK Unterspiesheim and 1. FC Oberhaid were directly relegated, while TG Höchberg and 1. FC Gerolzhofen had to enter the promotion/relegation round with the Bezirksliga runners-up where both lost and were relegated. For the 2013–14 season four clubs were promoted to the league, FC Viktoria Kahl, SV Garitz, Würzburger FV II, and SpVgg Stegaurach. Three clubs were relegated from the Bayernliga to the Landesliga Nordwest, 1. FC Sand, DJK Don Bosco Bamberg and TSV Kleinrinderfeld. Apart from these clubs the league also received SpVgg Ansbach who moved from the Mitte division to the Nordwest after the 2012–13 season while, in turn, SV Pettstadt and 1. FC Strullendorf were moved from Nordwest to the Nordost division.

== Modus ==
The league is played in a home-and-away format with the league champion being directly promoted to the Bayernliga. The runners-up enters a promotion round with the other four Landesliga runners-up and the Bayernliga teams placed just above the direct relegation ranks, 15th and 16th in the south and 15th in the north, for additional spots in this league. The bottom three teams from the Landesliga are directly relegated to the Bezirksligas. The teams placed 14th and 15th have to play-off with the Bezirksliga runners-up for their place in the Landesliga.

The 2019–20 season was interrupted by the coronavirus disease pandemic in Germany that began in March 2020. It was later suspended until 31 August, forcing a cancellation of the 2020–21 season as the BFV approved a resumption of the preceding one, which was curtailed in May 2021.

== Top-three of the Landesliga ==
The following teams have finished in the top-three in the league:

Season	Champions	Runners-up	Third
2012–13	SV Erlenbach	SV Pettstadt	FVgg Bayern Kitzingen
2013–14	SpVgg Ansbach	Viktoria Kahl	TSV Abtswind
2014–15	Don Bosco Bamberg	**1. FC Sand**	TSV Abtswind
2015–16	SpVgg Ansbach	**Würzburger Kickers II**	1. FC Schweinfurt 05 II
2016–17	1. FC Schweinfurt 05 II	**SpVgg Jahn Forchheim**	TSV Abtswind
2017–18	TSV Abtswind	**ASV Vach**	TSV Unterpleichfeld
2018–19	TSV Karlburg	**Viktoria Kahl**	TG Höchberg
2019–21	VS Aschaffenburg	Alemannia Haibach	SV Friesen
2021–22	1. FC Geesdorf	TuS Röllbach	1. FC Lichtenfels

- Promoted teams in **bold**.
- The 2019–20 season was suspended and later extended to 2021, when it was curtailed and the top three were ranked on a points per game basis.

== League placings ==
The complete list of clubs and placings in the league since its inception in 2012:

Club	13	14	15	16	17	18	19	20	21	22	23
DJK Don Bosco Bamberg	**B**	6	**1**	**B**	**B**	**B**	**B**	**B**	**B**	**B**	**B**
1. FC Sand	**B**	5	2	**B**	**B**	**B**	**B**	**B**	**B**	**B**	x
SpVgg Ansbach	4^{+}	**1**	**B**	**1**	**B**	**B**	**B**	**B**	**B**	**B**	**B**
Würzburger Kickers II				2	**B**	**B**	**B**				
1. FC Schweinfurt 05 II			5	3	**1**	**B**					
TSV Abtswind	4	3	3	4	3	**1**	**B**	**B**	**B**	**B**	**B**
FC Eintracht Bamberg	**R**	**R**	**R**	**B**	17		**1**^{#}	**B**	**B**	**B**	**B**
TSV Karlburg	7	14	9	11	13	14	**1**	**B**	**B**	**B**	x
Vatan Spor Aschaffenburg								1	**1**	**B**	x
1. FC Geesdorf							13	3	5	**1**	**B**
TuS Röllbach					9	13	12	18	16	2	x
1. FC Lichtenfels					8	10^{#}	9^{#}	5	7	3	x
FT Schweinfurt	8	15	18					4	6	4	x
FC Coburg				12	15		15^{#}	17	14	5	x
Alemannia Haibach	**B**	**B**	**B**	**B**	**B**	9	5	2	2	6	x
SpVgg Jahn Forchheim	**B**	**B**	**B**	**B**	2	**B**	**B**	7^{#}	6^{#}	6^{#}	x^{#}
DJK Schweb./Schwem.				8	4	7	4	9	9	7	x
TSV 1869 Rottendorf										8	x
FC Fuchsstadt					7	11	11	10	10	9	x
FC Viktoria Kahl		2	12	14	14		2	**B**	**B**	10	x
SV Friesen	2^{#}	6^{#}	6^{#}	18^{#}		11^{#}	12^{#}	8	3	11	x
SV Memmelsdorf	**B**	**B**	**B**	10	5	6^{#}	8^{#}	6	4	12	x^{#}
TSV Gochsheim										13	x
TG Höchberg	14		4	7	12	5	3	13	12	14	x
TSV Lengfeld	13	16				11	7	14	15	15	x
SC Sylvia Ebersdorf										16	
TSV Unterpleichfeld					10	3	6	7	8	17	
TSV Kleinrinderfeld	**B**	7	7	5	6	12	10	12	13	18	
ASV Vach	16^{#}	10^{#}	9^{#}	4^{#}	6^{#}	2	**B**	9^{#}	11^{#}	18^{#}	
SV Euerbach/Kützberg						4	9	11	11	19	
VfL Frohnlach	**R**	**B**	**B**	**B**	**B**	14^{#}		15	18		
TuS Feuchtwangen				16^{†}		6	14	17^{#}	17^{#}		
Baiersdorfer SV			11	16^{#}				18^{#}	18^{#}		
ASV Rimpar	5	9	8	13	11	8	8	16	17		
SV Erlenbach	**1**	**B**	**B**	**B**	**B**	**B**	15				
SC Aufkirchen							16				
ESV Ansbach-Eyb						15					
TSV Heimbuchenthal						16					
FVgg Bayern Kitzingen	3	8	13	9	16						
TSV Neustadt/Aisch	6	4	6	6							
TSV Ebensfeld				15							
SV Euerbach				16							
VfL Frohnlach II			15^{#}	17							
FC Blau-Weiß Leinach	9	10	10	18							
Würzburger FV II		13	14								
SpVgg Stegaurach		12	15								
SV Pettstadt	2	13^{#}	16								
TuS Frammersbach	10	11	17								x
SV Garitz		17									
1. FC Augsfeld	11	18									
1. FC Strullendorf	12	18^{#}									
1. FC Gerolzhofen	15										
TSV Bergrheinfeld	16										
SV-DJK Unterspiesheim	17										
1. FC Oberhaid	18										
DJK Dampfach											x
TSV Mönchröden											x

- Placings for 2020 were based on the table at the point of suspension during the coronavirus pandemic. Final placings were after the curtailment of the resumed 2019–20 season in 2021.

=== Key ===
Symbol	Key
**R**	Regionalliga Bayern
**B**	Bayernliga
**1**	League champions
Place	League
Place^{+}	Played in the Central division that season.
Place^{#}	Played in the Northeast division that season.
Place^{†}	Played in the Southwest division that season.
Blank	Played at a league level below this league
