= 2009–10 Bayernliga =

Bayernliga
- Season: 2009–10
- Champions: FC Memmingen
- Promoted: FC Memmingen
- Relegated: SpVgg Ansbach VfL Frohnlach SV Memmelsdorf TSG Thannhausen: 1. FC Bad Kötzting
- Matches played: 342
- Goals scored: 999 (2.92 per match)
- Top goalscorer: Christian Doll (21 goals)

The 2009–10 season of the Bayernliga, the fifth tier of the German football league system in the state of Bavaria at the time, was the 65th season of the league.

== Overview ==
The league champions, FC Memmingen, were directly promoted to the Regionalliga Süd. It was Memmingen's first-ever Bayernliga title, won after having played 43 seasons in the league.

The bottom four clubs were directly relegated from the league while 15th placed SpVgg Ansbach had to enter the relegation round with the Landesliga runners-up where it ultimately lost to 1. FC Schweinfurt 05 and was relegated. Of the relegated clubs only VfL Frohnlach made an immediate return to the Bayernliga in the following season while SV Memmelsdorf returned to the league in 2012 when it was expanded from one to two divisions. 1. FC Bad Kötzting and SpVgg Ansbach won promotion back to the Bayernliga in 2014 while TSG Thannhausen was unable to make a return.

Christian Doll of TSV Aindling was the league's top scorer with 21 goals.

== Table ==
The 2009–10 season saw five new clubs in the league, TSV 1860 Rosenheim, SV Schalding-Heining and SV Memmelsdorf, all promoted from the Landesliga Bayern, while SpVgg Unterhaching II and TSV Großbardorf had been relegated from the Regionalliga Süd to the league.

For Schalding-Heining and Memmelsdorf it was their first-ever season in the league while Rosenheim had last played in the Bayernliga in 1998. The two clubs relegated to the league had both been promoted to the Regionalliga in 2008 during a league expansion but lasted for only one season at this level.

Pos	Team	Pld	W	D	L	GF	GA	GD	Pts	Promotion, qualification or relegation
1	FC Memmingen (C, P)	36	22	8	6	57	23	+34	74	Promotion to Regionalliga Süd
2	FC Ismaning	36	18	9	9	70	47	+23	63	
3	SpVgg Unterhaching II	36	18	8	10	65	48	+17	62	
4	TSV Aindling	36	17	8	11	60	46	+14	59	
5	TSV Rain am Lech	36	16	11	9	54	45	+9	59	
6	SV Seligenporten	36	16	10	10	61	53	+8	58	
7	FC Ingolstadt 04 II	36	17	7	12	61	53	+8	58	
8	FSV Erlangen-Bruck	36	15	11	10	56	43	+13	56	
9	SpVgg Bayreuth	36	15	9	12	44	34	+10	54	
10	SpVgg Bayern Hof	36	14	10	12	45	44	+1	52	
11	TSV Buchbach	36	14	7	15	71	62	+9	49	
12	TSV 1860 Rosenheim	36	13	10	13	53	47	+6	49	
13	SV Schalding-Heining	36	15	2	19	46	65	−19	47	
14	TSV Großbardorf	36	12	8	16	49	50	−1	44	
15	SpVgg Ansbach (R)	36	12	6	18	42	57	−15	42	Qualification to relegation playoffs
16	VfL Frohnlach (R)	36	10	10	16	43	59	−16	40	Relegation to Landesliga Bayern
17	SV Memmelsdorf (R)	36	6	11	19	36	74	−38	29	Relegation to Landesliga Bayern
18	TSG Thannhausen (R)	36	7	7	22	43	77	−34	28	Relegation to Landesliga Bayern
19	1. FC Bad Kötzting (R)	36	6	6	24	43	72	−29	24	Relegation to Landesliga Bayern

Source: Weltfussball.de, f-archiv.de
Rules for classification: 1) Points; 2) Decider
(C) Champions; (P) Promoted; (R) Relegated

== Bayernliga promotion round ==
The 15th placed Bayernliga team had to face the runners-up of the three Landesligas for one more place in the Bayernliga.

Date	Match			Result
Semi-finals : in Schwabach and Dietenhofen
5 June 2010	VfB Eichstätt (Süd)	–	1. FC Schweinfurt 05 (Nord)	1–2
5 June 2010	TSV Neustadt/Aisch (Mitte)	–	SpVgg Ansbach	1–2 aet
Final : in Weismain
9 June 2010	SpVgg Ansbach	–	1. FC Schweinfurt 05	0–3
