= DJK Waldberg =

German football club

- Full name: Deutsche Jugendkraft Waldberg e. V.
- Founded: 1953
- League: A-Klasse (X)
- 2016–17: A-Klasse (X), 3rd
Home colours	Away colours

The DJK Waldberg is a German association football club from the village of Waldberg, near Sandberg, Bavaria.

The club's most notable achievement was qualifying for the first round of the German Cup, the DFB-Pokal, in 1997–98 where it lost 1–16 to FC Bayern Munich in front of 35,500. Waldberg's defeat is, as of 2012, still the highest of any club in the German Cup.

== History ==
Formed in 1953 the club played in the lower amateur leagues for the most part of its history.

DJK Waldberg won promotion to the Bezirksliga Unterfranken-Ost in 1987 but was unable to qualify for the new Bezirksoberliga Unterfranken in 1987–88, finishing twelfth. DJK quickly improved, coming fifth in the following year, followed by a league championship and promotion in 1989–90.

In the Bezirksoberliga Unterfranken the club finished tenth in its first year followed by a twelfth place in 1991–92. The team's third season there however proved to be its best, coming second and earning promotion to the tier five Landesliga Bayern-Nord.

For the next eight season the club played in the Landesliga, initially as a mid-table side. In 1997 the team finished fifth in the league, its best performance so far, but also managed to win the local cup competition, the Lower Franconian Cup, and to qualify for the first round of the German Cup.

The club drew FC Bayern Munich as its opposition for the first round and decided to play its home game in Nuremberg to be able to attract more spectators. In front of 35,500 DJK was soundly defeated, 1–16, which is still the record defeat in a German Cup match. In the game, Carsten Jancker scored five goals against Waldberg, equalising an all-time scoring record he would improve to six goals in 2004 in 1. FC Kaiserslautern's 15–0 defeat of FC Schönberg 95.

In the league the club continued to improve, finishing fourth in 1997–98 and second in 1998–99. This result allowed the club to take part in the promotion round to the Bayernliga where it was however unsuccessful and had to remain in the Landesliga. The following season Waldberg came only eleventh. The club decided during the 2000–01 season in the Landesliga to withdraw to the lower amateur leagues again and not to play out the season.

The club rose to Bezirksliga level again by 2004, playing for a season in the Bezirksliga Unterfranken-Ost before this league became the Bezirksliga Unterfranken 2. It remained at this level until 2010 when it was relegated back to the Kreisliga. Until 2014 the club played in the tier eight Kreisliga Rhön, finishing 16th in the 2013–14 season and being relegated to the Kreisklasse. A last-place finish in the Kreisklasse in 2015–16 took the club down another level, now to the A-Klasse.

== Honours ==
The club's honours:

=== League ===
- Landesliga Bayern-Nord
  - Runners-up: 1999
- Bezirksoberliga Unterfranken
  - Runners-up: 1993
- Bezirksliga Unterfranken-Ost
  - Champions: 1990

=== Cup ===
- Unterfranken Cup
  - Winners: 1997

== Recent seasons ==
The recent season-by-season performance of the club:

Season	Division	Tier	Position
1999–2000	Landesliga Bayern-Nord	V	11th
2000–01	Landesliga Bayern-Nord	V	18th ↓
2001–02			
2002–03			
2003–04			
2004–05	Bezirksliga Unterfranken-Ost	VII	4th
2005–06	Bezirksliga Unterfranken 2	VII	3rd
2006–07	Bezirksliga Unterfranken 2	VII	5th
2007–08	Bezirksliga Unterfranken 2	VII	12th
2008–09	Bezirksliga Unterfranken 2	VIII	8th
2009–10	Bezirksliga Unterfranken 2	VIII	13th ↓
2010–11	Kreisliga Rhön	IX	4th
2011–12	Kreisliga Rhön	IX	8th
2012–13	Kreisliga Rhön	VIII	12th
2013–14	Kreisliga Rhön	VIII	16th ↓
2014–15	Kreisklasse Rhön 2	IX	3rd
2015–16	Kreisklasse Rhön 2	IX	16th ↓
2016–17	A-Klasse	X	3rd
2017–18	A-Klasse	X	

- With the introduction of the Bezirksoberligas in 1988 as the new fifth tier, below the Landesligas, all leagues below dropped one tier. With the introduction of the Regionalligas in 1994 and the 3. Liga in 2008 as the new third tier, below the 2. Bundesliga, all leagues below dropped one tier. With the establishment of the Regionalliga Bayern as the new fourth tier in Bavaria in 2012 the Bayernliga was split into a northern and a southern division, the number of Landesligas expanded from three to five and the Bezirksoberligas abolished. All leagues from the Bezirksligas onward were elevated one tier.

↑ Promoted	↓ Relegated

== DFB Cup appearances ==
The club has qualified for the first round of the German Cup just once, in 1997:

Season	Round	Date	Home	Away	Result	Attendance
1997–98 DFB-Pokal	First round	15 August 1997	DJK Waldberg	FC Bayern Munich	1–16	35,500
