= Kleinrinderfeld =

- Municipality
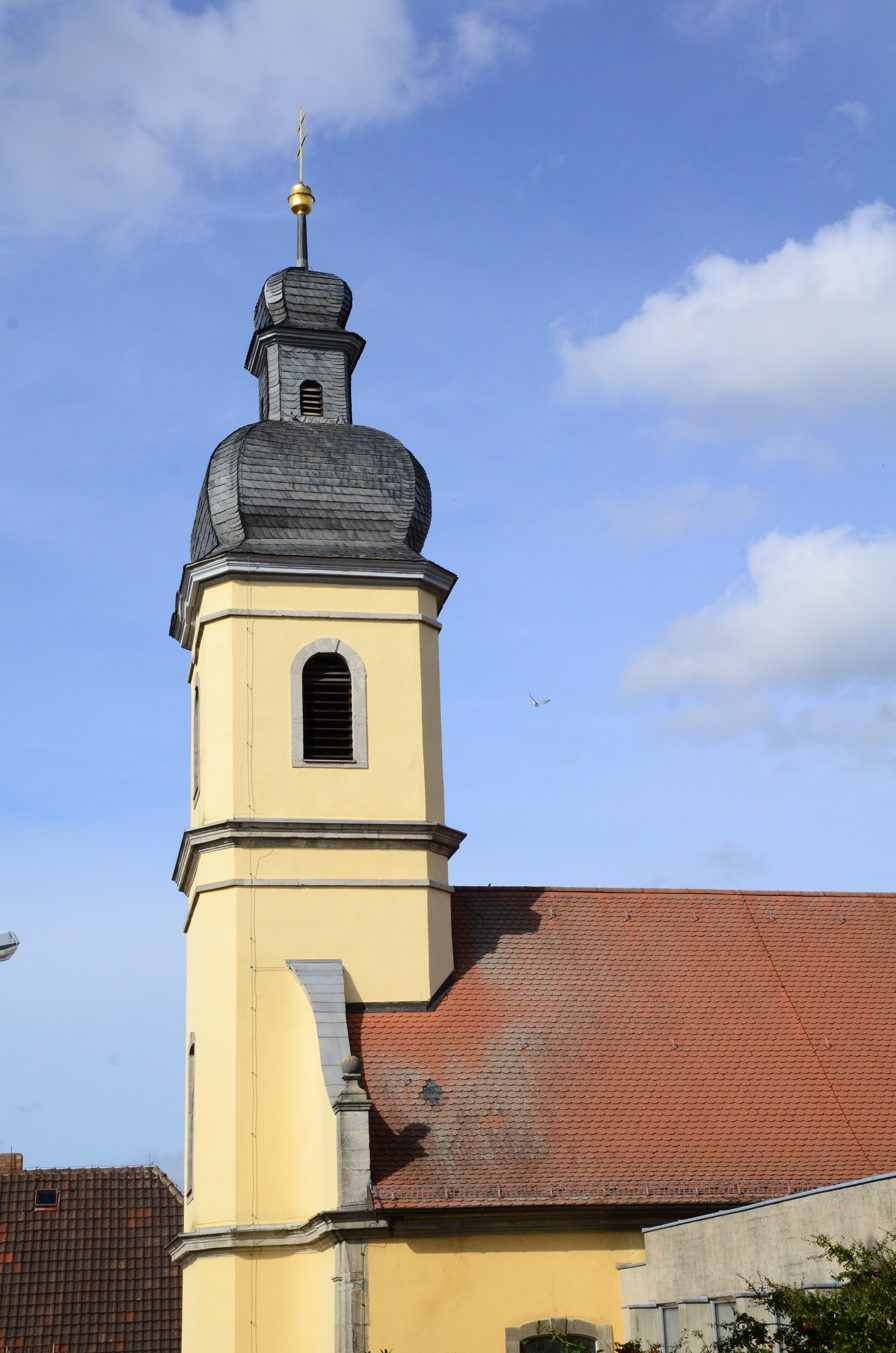
- Church of Saint Martin

- Coat of arms

- Location of Kleinrinderfeld within Würzburg district
- Interactive map of Kleinrinderfeld
- Location within Germany Location within Bavaria
- Coordinates: 49°42′N 9°51′E
- Country: Germany
- State: Bavaria
- Admin. region: Unterfranken
- District: Würzburg

Government
  - Mayor (2020–26): Harald Engbrecht

Area
  - Total: 7.74 km^{2} (2.99 sq mi)
- Elevation: 311 m (1,020 ft)

Population (2025-12-31)
  - Total: 1,956
  - Density: 253/km^{2} (655/sq mi)
- Time zone: UTC+01:00 (CET)
  - Summer (DST): UTC+02:00 (CEST)
- Postal codes: 97271
- Dialling codes: 09366
- Vehicle registration: WÜ
- Website: www.kleinrinderfeld.de

Kleinrinderfeld is a municipality within the district of Würzburg, Bavaria, Germany.

== Sport ==
The town's association football club TSV Kleinrinderfeld experienced its greatest success in 2012 when it won promotion to the new northern division of the Bayernliga but lasted for only one season at this level before being relegated again.
