= SV Erlenbach =

German football club

- Full name: Sportverein Erlenbach am Main 1919 e.V.
- Founded: 19 March 1919
- Ground: Waldsportplatz
- Chairman: Lars Nowag
- Manager: Jürgen Baier
- League: Bayernliga Nord (V)
- 2015–16: 14th
| Home colours | Away colours |

The SV Erlenbach is a German association football club from the town of Erlenbach am Main, Bavaria.

The club's greatest success came in 2013 when it qualified for the northern division of Bayernliga, the fifth tier of the German football league system.

== History ==
While football was played in Erlenbach before the First World War it was not until after the war that it became organised when FV Viktoria Erlenbach was formed on 19 March 1919. The inspiration for the name Viktoria came from Viktoria Aschaffenburg, formed in 1901, which functioned as a "godparent" for the new club.

Viktoria initially struggled to find a home ground until a patch of land became available after a local forest fire. In the early years the club took part in local competitions. The club struggled with the problems of the hyperinflation, with a bill of 374 Billion Reichsmark as costs for the trip to an away game being recorded. It continued in local competitions up until 1941 when the events of the Second World War put a stop to local football. The final teams the club fielded were already mostly composed of soldiers of the German Wehrmacht.

After the war football soon resumed in Erlenbach, first in the form of friendlies, later, from 1946, as competitive matches in the Kreisliga. Initially grouped in the A-Klasse the club rose to the 2. Amateurliga Unterfranken in 1951 and spent the next 17 seasons there. Relegation followed in 1968, the 2. Amateurliga having been renamed to Bezirksliga in 1963, and the club determined that its old sporting facilities were no longer adequate, deciding to upgrade the grounds.

In 1949, another football club was formed in Erlenbach and name Eintracht Erlenbach'. This club never climbed as high as local rival Viktoria and, in 1969, the two clubs started discussing a merger. After both sides agreed the SV 1919 Erlenbach was formed on 20 February 1970.

Three years after the merger the new club won the A-Klasse Spessart and earned promotion to the Bezirksliga Unterfranken-West.

The club first rose above Lower Franconian level when it won promotion to the tier four Landesliga Bayern-Nord in 1977. SVE came eleventh in its first season there but followed this up with two runners-up finishes in 1979 and 1980. At the time, no promotion was available for the Landesliga runners-up, the promotion play-offs to the Bayernliga being introduced in 1981, and Erlenbach remained in the Landesliga, having to wait another 33 years to win promotion to this league. The club slowly declined after this and, in 1984, was relegated back to the Bezirksliga.

SV Erlenbach was not a founding member of the new Bezirksoberliga Unterfranken when it was formed in 1988 but won promotion to the league two years later, in 1990. The club, during the leagues 24 seasons of existence, became the holder of a number of records. Erlenbach spent more seasons than any other club in the league, 18, led the all-time table and was the only club to have won three league titles.

The clubs first stint in the league lasted for five seasons before a league title took it up to the Landesliga Bayern-Nord. It spent the 1995–96 season there but, finishing 17th, was promptly relegated. Six more Bezirksoberliga seasons followed before SVE won another league title, moved up to the Landesliga once more, finished 17th again and dropped back to the Bezirksoberliga.

Back in the Bezirksoberliga Unterfranken the club immediately won another league championship and moved back up to the Landesliga, this time for two seasons. In its first year back, 2004–05, it came 13th but an 18th place the season after meant it dropped once more back to the Bezirksoberliga.

Another six seasons in this league followed in which SVE never really came close to promotion again. In 2011–12, the leagues last season, the club finished eighth and managed to qualify for the new Landesliga Bayern-Nordwest, the Landesliga having been expanded from three to five divisions. SVE won the league in its first season and moved up to the Bayernliga.

In its first-ever Bayernliga season the club finished in ninth place.

== Honours ==
The club's honours:

- Landesliga Bayern-Nordwest
  - Champions: 2013
- Landesliga Bayern-Nord
  - Runners-up: 1979, 1980
- Bezirksoberliga Unterfranken
  - Champions: 1995, 2002, 2004
- Bezirksliga Unterfranken-West
  - Champions: 1990

== Recent seasons ==
The recent season-by-season performance of the club:

| Season | Division | Tier | Position |
|---|---|---|---|
| 1999–2000 | Bezirksoberliga Unterfranken | VI | 5th |
| 2000–01 | Bezirksoberliga Unterfranken | VI | 8th |
| 2001–02 | Bezirksoberliga Unterfranken | VI | 1st ↑ |
| 2002–03 | Landesliga Bayern-Nord | V | 17th ↓ |
| 2003–04 | Bezirksoberliga Unterfranken | VI | 1st ↑ |
| 2004–05 | Landesliga Bayern-Nord | V | 13th |
| 2005–06 | Landesliga Bayern-Nord | V | 18th ↓ |
| 2006–07 | Bezirksoberliga Unterfranken | VI | 5th |
| 2007–08 | Bezirksoberliga Unterfranken | VI | 12th |
| 2008–09 | Bezirksoberliga Unterfranken | VII | 8th |
| 2009–10 | Bezirksoberliga Unterfranken | VII | 7th |
| 2010–11 | Bezirksoberliga Unterfranken | VII | 13th |
| 2011–12 | Bezirksoberliga Unterfranken | VII | 8th ↑ |
| 2012–13 | Landesliga Bayern-Nordwest | VI | 1st ↑ |
| 2013–14 | Bayernliga Nord | V | 9th |
| 2014–15 | Bayernliga Nord | V | 10th |
| 2015–16 | Bayernliga Nord | V | 14th |
| 2016–17 | Bayernliga Nord | V | |

- With the introduction of the Bezirksoberligas in 1988 as the new fifth tier, below the Landesligas, all leagues below dropped one tier. With the introduction of the Regionalligas in 1994 and the 3. Liga in 2008 as the new third tier, below the 2. Bundesliga, all leagues below dropped one tier. With the establishment of the Regionalliga Bayern as the new fourth tier in Bavaria in 2012 the Bayernliga was split into a northern and a southern division, the number of Landesligas expanded from three to five and the Bezirksoberligas abolished. All leagues from the Bezirksligas onwards were elevated one tier.

=== Key ===
| ↑ Promoted | ↓ Relegated |
