= FC Coburg =

German football club

- Full name: FC Coburg e.V.
- Founded: 8 September 2011
- Ground: Dr.-Eugen-Stocke-Stadion
- Capacity: 4,500
- Chairman: Walter Luft
- Manager: Lars Scheler
- League: Landesliga Bayern-Nordost (VI)
- 2025–26: Bayernliga Nord, 16th of 18 (relegated)
Home colours	Away colours	Third colours

The FC Coburg is a German association football club from the town of Coburg, Bavaria. Coburg became part of Bavaria in 1920, after the First World War. The club is a phoenix club of DVV Coburg.

== History ==
DVV Coburg was formed in 2000 when VfB Coburg merged with local side DJK/Viktoria Coburg (which was established in 1974 in a merger of FC Viktoria 09 Coburg, formed 1909, and DJK Rot-Weiß Coburg, formed 1931). DVV's predecessor the VfB was by far the most outstanding, spending 21 seasons in the tier three Fußball-Bayernliga from 1952 to 1984. The club also made a single appearance in the German Cup in 1977–78, losing 3–0 at fellow amateurs TuS Langerwehe who would go on to reach the fourth round.

Despite DVV's initial success, in 2011, affected by financial trouble, the club was relegated back to the Bezirksoberliga The club played its final season in the Bezirksoberliga in 2011–12 as DVV and were disbanded at the end of the season.

On 4 August 2011, the dissolution of DVV on 30 June 2012 was approved. The season of football teams continued until then. On 8 September 2011, FC Coburg was founded, which took over the players and licensing, as well as the youth academy of DVV. For the season 2012/13 all teams of FC Coburg in the leagues in which last had played the corresponding teams of DVV. The new club, FC Coburg, was eventually permitted to take over the league places of DVV in senior and youth football.

The club has continued DVV's traditions and is still attempting promotion from the Bezirksliga Oberfranken West, the 7th tier of German football, hoping to emulate VfB's former glory. FC dismissed its coach Michael Eberhardt in early November 2014 despite comfortably leading the league, citing a disrupted relationship between coach and team as one of the reasons.

The club won the Bezirksliga in 2014–15 and won promotion to the Landesliga Bayern-Nordwest.

== Non-senior teams ==
FC Coburg has inherited a quite extensive youth system from their pre-predecessors DVV Coburg. They have a reserve team FC Coburg II and 12 of youth teams starting at under-7 level all through to senior football.

== Honours ==
The club's honours:

- Bezirksliga Oberfranken-West
  - Champions: 2015
  - Runners-up: 2018

== FC Coburg seasons ==
The season-by-season performance of the club:

Season	Division	Tier	Position
2012–13	Bezirksliga Oberfranken-West	VII	9th
2013–14	Bezirksliga Oberfranken-West	VII	3rd
2014–15	Bezirksliga Oberfranken-West	VII	1st ↑
2015–16	Landesliga Bayern-Nordwest	VI	12th
2016–17	Landesliga Bayern-Nordwest	VI	15th ↓
2017–18	Bezirksliga Oberfranken-West	VII	2nd ↑
2018–19	Landesliga Bayern-Nordost	VI	

↑ Promoted	↓ Relegated
