= TSV Kleinrinderfeld =

- Full name: Turn- und Sportverein Kleinrinderfeld e. V.
- Founded: 1923
- Ground: Sportanlage Deutschherrenstraße
- Capacity: 1,500
- Manager: Harald Funsch
- League: Landesliga Bayern-Nordwest (V)
- 2015–16: 5th
Home colours	Away colours

The TSV Kleinrinderfeld is a German association football club from the town of Kleinrinderfeld, Bavaria.

The club's greatest success came in 2012 when it qualified for the new northern division of the expanded Bayernliga, the fifth tier of the German football league system but it lasted for only one season at this level before being relegated again.

== History ==
For most of its history the club has been a non-descript amateur side in local Bavarian football. The club was formed as ATSV Kleinrinderfeld in 1923 as a working men's sports club. Because of this background ATSV was outlawed by the Nazis in 1933 and it took until 1937 for a new club to be granted permission to form, the TSV Kleinrinderfeld.

From 1990 onwards the club played in the Bezirksliga Unterfranken-Mitte. It changed to the western division in 1993 and earned promotion to the Bezirksoberliga for the first time.

Kleinrinderfeld played for two seasons in the Bezirksoberliga Unterfranken from 1994 to 1996, finishing third in its first year but being relegated the season after. It made an immediate return to the Bezirksoberliga in 1997 and played another four seasons at this level, now with a seventh place as its best result. Relegated again in 2001 the club would not return to this league for the next seven seasons.

After two seasons in the Bezirksliga Kleinrinderfeld dropped down to the Kreisliga for a season in 2003 but made an immediate return. Another four Bezirksliga seasons followed before a league title took the club back up to the Bezirksoberliga.

After promotion back to the Bezirksoberliga in 2008 Kleinrindefeld played the next three seasons in this league, achieving good results, culminating in a runners-up finish in 2011 and promotion to the Landesliga.

The club played the 2011–12 season in the Landesliga Bayern-Nord and came seventh which was sufficient to qualify it for the new northern division of the expanded Bayernliga. TSV lasted for only one season at this level, finishing last and being relegated to the Landesliga Bayern-Nordwest, where it plays today.

== Honours ==
The club's honours:

- Bezirksoberliga Unterfranken
  - Runners-up: 2011
- Bezirksliga Unterfranken
  - Champions: 2008
  - Runners-up: 1992, 1994, 2002, 2007

== Recent seasons ==
The recent season-by-season performance of the club:

Season	Division	Tier	Position
1999–2000	Bezirksoberliga Unterfranken	VI	11th
2000–01	Bezirksoberliga Unterfranken	VI	13th ↓
2001–02	Bezirksliga Unterfranken-Mitte	VI	2nd
2002–03	Bezirksliga Unterfranken-Mitte	VI	13th ↓
2003–04	Kreisliga	VIII	↑
2004–05	Bezirksliga Unterfranken-Mitte	VII	5th
2005–06	Bezirksliga Unterfranken 1	VII	6th
2006–07	Bezirksliga Unterfranken 1	VII	2nd
2007–08	Bezirksliga Unterfranken 1	VII	1st ↑
2008–09	Bezirksoberliga Unterfranken	VII	5th
2009–10	Bezirksoberliga Unterfranken	VII	8th
2010–11	Bezirksoberliga Unterfranken	VII	2nd ↑
2011–12	Landesliga Bayern-Nord	VI	7th ↑
2012–13	Bayernliga Nord	V	18th ↓
2013–14	Landesliga Bayern-Nordwest	VI	7th
2014–15	Landesliga Bayern-Nordwest	VI	7th
2015–16	Landesliga Bayern-Nordwest	VI	5th
2016–17	Landesliga Bayern-Nordwest	VI	

- With the introduction of the Bezirksoberligas in 1988 as the new fifth tier, below the Landesligas, all leagues below dropped one tier. With the introduction of the Regionalligas in 1994 and the 3. Liga in 2008 as the new third tier, below the 2. Bundesliga, all leagues below dropped one tier. With the establishment of the Regionalliga Bayern as the new fourth tier in Bavaria in 2012 the Bayernliga was split into a northern and a southern division, the number of Landesligas expanded from three to five and the Bezirksoberligas abolished. All leagues from the Bezirksligas onwards were elevated one tier.

=== Key ===
↑ Promoted	↓ Relegated
