= SV Heidingsfeld =

German football club

- Full name: Sportverein Heidingsfeld 1919 e.V.
- Founded: 1919
- Ground: Sportpark Herieden
- Chairman: Udo Feldinger
- Manager: Frank Wettengel
- League: Bezirksliga Unterfranken-West (VII)
- 2015–16: 12th
Home colours	Away colours

The SV Heidingsfeld is a German association football club from the Heidingsfeld suburb of Würzburg, Bavaria. For this reason, the club is sometimes also referred to as SVH Würzburg.

The club's greatest successes were its four seasons spent in the Fußball-Bayernliga between 1985 and 1995, with a seventh place in 1986–87, as its best result and qualifying twice for the first round of the German Cup, in 1983 and 1987.

== History ==
The club was formed on 17 February 1919. After the Second World War, the club briefly lost its independence, becoming part of the TSV Würzburg-Heidingsfeld in 1946, but it left this club again in 1949 to go its one way.

SVH won promotion to the tier four Landesliga Bayern-Nord (IV) in 1978 and, after struggling for the first two seasons, was able to establish itself in the league. Heidingsfeld made its first appearance on the national football scene in 1983, when it qualified for the first round of the German Cup, where it defeated fellow amateurs SV Göppingen 5–1. In the second round, at home against Hannover 96, the club was knocked out through a 1–3 defeat.

After two second-place finishes in the Landesliga in 1983 and 1984, with defeats in the promotion round, the club won a league championship in 1985 and earned promotion to the Bayernliga on its third attempt.

In the Bayernliga (III) for the first time, Heidingsfeld came 15th in its inaugural season. The club was much improved in the following year, coming seventh but once more came 15th in 1988 and was relegated back to the Landesliga. In the same season, the club made its second German Cup appearance, but lost 1–2 to Bayer 05 Uerdingen after leading 1–0 up to the 62nd minute. Back in the Landesliga for the next six seasons, the club remained a top side, finishing second on two more occasions, earning another promotion in 1994.

SV Heidingsfeld's fourth and to date final Bayernliga (IV) season was no success, the club came 17th and was relegated from the league again. On return to the Landesliga, the club was handed through to the Bezirksoberliga Unterfranken (VI) after coming 16th in 1996. It was not able to recover from this drop and was unable to return to the Landesliga.

Back in Lower Franconian football, SVH came fifth in its first two years in the Bezirksoberliga. After this, results declined and a 13th place in 2000–01 meant the club dropped another level, now to the Bezirksliga (VII).

The club was grouped in the Bezirksliga Unterfranken-Mitte, finishing in mid field in the next four seasons there. In 2005, the three Bezirksligas in Lower Franconia were reduced to two and renamed and SVH was placed in the Bezirksliga Unterfranken Gruppe 1, where the club initially played as an upper table side, finishing in third place on two occasions. However, in 2008–09 a 14th-place finish meant another relegation for the club. After a number of years in the Kreisliga Würzburg 1 as an upper table side the club won the league in 2013 and earned promotion back to the Bezirksliga.

== Honours ==
The club's honours:

=== League ===
- Landesliga Bayern-Nord
  - Champions: 1985
  - Runners-up: 1983, 1984, 1992, 1994
- Kreisliga Würzburg 1
  - Champions: 2013

== Past managers ==
The club has had some managers in the past who have coached or played at professional level, like Werner Lorant (1985–86) and Dieter Eckstein (1999–2000).

== Recent seasons ==
The recent season-by-season performance of the club:

Season	Division	Tier	Position
1999–2000	Bezirksoberliga Unterfranken	VI	10th
2000–01	Bezirksoberliga Unterfranken	VI	13th ↓
2001–02	Bezirksliga Unterfranken-Mitte	VII	10th
2002–03	Bezirksliga Unterfranken-Mitte	VII	6th
2003–04	Bezirksliga Unterfranken-Mitte	VII	5th
2004–05	Bezirksliga Unterfranken-Mitte	VII	7th
2005–06	Bezirksliga Unterfranken Gruppe 1	VII	8th
2006–07	Bezirksliga Unterfranken Gruppe 1	VII	3rd
2007–08	Bezirksliga Unterfranken Gruppe 1	VII	3rd
2008–09	Bezirksliga Unterfranken Gruppe 1	VIII	14th ↓
2009–10	Kreisliga Würzburg 1	IX	4th
2010–11	Kreisliga Würzburg 1	IX	3rd
2011–12	Kreisliga Würzburg 1	IX	3rd
2012–13	Kreisliga Würzburg 1	VIII	1st ↑
2013–14	Bezirksliga Unterfranken-West	VII	12th
2014–15	Bezirksliga Unterfranken-West	VII	5th
2015–16	Bezirksliga Unterfranken-West	VII	12th
2016–17	Bezirksliga Unterfranken-West	VII	

- With the introduction of the Bezirksoberligas in 1988 as the new fifth tier, below the Landesligas, all leagues below dropped one tier. With the introduction of the Regionalligas in 1994 and the 3. Liga in 2008 as the new third tier, below the 2. Bundesliga, all leagues below dropped one tier. With the establishment of the Regionalliga Bayern as the new fourth tier in Bavaria in 2012 the Bayernliga was split into a northern and a southern division, the number of Landesligas expanded from three to five and the Bezirksoberligas abolished. All leagues from the Bezirksligas onwards were elevated one tier.

↑ Promoted	↓ Relegated

== DFB Cup appearances ==
The club has qualified for the first round of the German Cup twice:

Season	Round	Date	Home	Away	Result	Attendance
1983–84	First round	26 August 1983	SV Heidingsfeld	SV Göppingen	5–1	
1983–84	Second round	8 October 1983	SV Heidingsfeld	Hannover 96	1–3	4,500
1987–88	First round	29 August 1987	SV Heidingsfeld	Bayer 05 Uerdingen	1–2	6,000
