= DJK Don Bosco Bamberg =

Football club based in germany

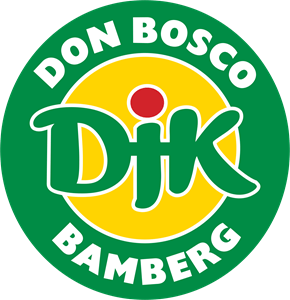
- Full name: Deutsche Jugendkraft Don Bosco Bamberg e. V. 1950
- Founded: 13 July 1950
- Ground: Rudi-Ziegler-Sportanlage
- Capacity: 3,000
- Manager: Andreas Baumer
- League: Bayernliga Nord (V)
- 2025–26: Landesliga Bayern-Nordwest, 1st of 18 (promoted)
Home colours	Away colours

The DJK Don Bosco Bamberg is a German association football club from the town of Bamberg, Bavaria. DJK stands for Deutsche Jugendkraft, a sports organisation associated with the Catholic Church while John Bosco, popularly known as Don Bosco, was an Italian Roman Catholic priest of the Latin Church, educator and writer of the 19th century.

The club's greatest success came in 2012 when it qualified for the new northern division of the expanded Bayernliga, the fifth tier of the German football league system but lasted for only one season there. It made a return to this league in 2015 after a Landesliga championship.

== History ==
DJK Don Bosco Bamberg was formed in 1950 by local catholic priest Richard Feuerlein. Its primary focus was to be towards providing sporting opportunities for the local youth, inspired by the work of Don Bosco who engaged in work with impoverished youth.

For most of its history the club has been a non-descript amateur side in local Bavarian football. The team rose as far as the Bezirksliga Oberfranken-West in 1996, but was soon relegated. Promoted in 2000 and relegated from this league again in 2002 it once more returned in 2006. After two more Bezirksliga seasons the club won the league in 2008 and earned promotion to the Bezirksoberliga Oberfranken. The club spent two seasons there before earning another promotion, now to the Landesliga.

The club played for two seasons in the Landesliga Bayern-Nord, until the league was disbanded in 2012. Don Bosco came seventh in its first season there but finished only twelfth in its second year. Through the promotion round, however, the club managed to qualify for the new northern division of the Bayernliga.

DJK Don Bosco lasted for only one season in the Bayernliga before being relegated again, now to the Landesliga Bayern-Nordwest, where it plays today. The club broke a Landesliga record when it won all of its first twelve games in the league at the start of the 2014–15 season, and eventually won the league and earned promotion back to the Bayernliga.

== Honours ==
The club's honours:

- Landesliga Bayern-Nordwest
  - Champions: 2015
- Bezirksoberliga Oberfranken
  - Champions: 2010
- Bezirksliga Oberfranken-West
  - Champions: 2008
- Kreisliga Bamberg
  - Runners-up: 2006

== Recent seasons ==
The recent season-by-season performance of the club:

Season	Division	Tier	Position
1999–2000	Kreisliga	VIII	↑
2000–01	Bezirksliga Oberfranken-West	VII	10th
2001–02	Bezirksliga Oberfranken-West	VII	15th ↓
2002–03			
2003–04			
2004–05	Kreisliga Bamberg	VIII	8th
2005–06	Kreisliga Bamberg	VIII	2nd ↑
2006–07	Bezirksliga Oberfranken-West	VII	5th
2007–08	Bezirksliga Oberfranken-West	VII	1st ↑
2008–09	Bezirksoberliga Oberfranken	VII	4th
2009–10	Bezirksoberliga Oberfranken	VII	1st ↑
2010–11	Landesliga Bayern-Nord	VI	7th
2011–12	Landesliga Bayern-Nord	VI	12th ↑
2012–13	Bayernliga Nord	V	16th ↓
2013–14	Landesliga Bayern-Nordwest	VI	6th
2014–15	Landesliga Bayern-Nordwest	VI	1st ↑
2015–16	Bayernliga Nord	V	11th
2016–17	Bayernliga Nord	V	11th
2017–18	Bayernliga Nord	V	13th
2018–19	Bayernliga Nord	V	8th
2019–21	Bayernliga Nord	V	13th
2021–22	Bayernliga Nord	V	6th
2022–23	Bayernliga Nord	V	

- With the introduction of the Bezirksoberligas in 1988 as the new fifth tier, below the Landesligas, all leagues below dropped one tier. With the introduction of the Regionalligas in 1994 and the 3. Liga in 2008 as the new third tier, below the 2. Bundesliga, all leagues below dropped one tier. With the establishment of the Regionalliga Bayern as the new fourth tier in Bavaria in 2012 the Bayernliga was split into a northern and a southern division, the number of Landesligas expanded from three to five and the Bezirksoberligas abolished. All leagues from the Bezirksligas onwards were elevated one tier.

=== Key ===
↑ Promoted	↓ Relegated
