= Bezirksoberliga Unterfranken =

- Founded: 1988
- Folded: 2012
- Country: Germany
- State: Bavaria
- Level on pyramid: Level 7
- Promotion to: Landesliga Nord
- Relegation to: Bezirksliga Group 1; Bezirksliga Group 2
- Last champions: ASV Rimpar (2011–12)

The Bezirksoberliga Unterfranken was the seventh tier of the German football league system in the Bavarian Regierungsbezirk of Lower Franconia (German: Unterfranken). Until the introduction of the 3. Liga in 2008 it was the sixth tier of the league system, until the introduction of the Regionalligas in 1994 the fifth tier.

The league was disbanded at the end of the 2011–12 season, when major changes to the Bavarian football league system were carried out. Above the Bezirksoberligas, the Landesligas were expanded in number from three to five divisions and the Bezirke have two to three regional leagues, the Bezirksligas, as its highest level again, similar to the system in place until 1988.

== Overview ==
The Bezirksoberligas in Bavaria were introduced in 1988 to create a highest single-division playing level for each of the seven Bezirke.

Before the introduction of the Bezirksoberligas, the Bezirksliga was the level of play below the Landesliga. The Bezirksliga Unterfranken-Gruppe 1 and Unterfranken-Gruppe 2 fed the Landesliga Bayern-Nord as they afterwards fed the Bezirksoberliga Unterfranken.

The winner of the Bezirksoberliga Unterfranken, like the winner of the Bezirksoberliga Oberfranken, was directly promoted to the Landesliga Bayern-Nord. The two second placed teams out of those leagues played-off for another promotion spot. The winner went to the Landesliga, the loser faced the 15th placed team out of the Landesliga for the last spot there. However, in some years additional promotion places were available in the Landesliga.

The three bottom teams of the Bezirksoberliga were relegated to the Bezirksliga, the team just above those faced a play-off against the second placed Bezirksliga teams.

With the league reform at the end of the 2011–12 season, which includes an expansion of the number of Landesligas from three to five, the Bezirksoberligas were disbanded. Instead, the Bezirksligas took the place of the Bezirksoberligas below the Landesligas once more.

The clubs from the Bezirksoberliga joined the following leagues:

- Champions : Promotion round to the Bayernliga, winners to the Bayernliga, losers to the Landesliga.
- Teams placed 2nd to 6th: Directly qualified to the Landesliga.
- Teams placed 7th to 10th: Four additional Landesliga places to be determined in a play-off round with the Bezirksliga champions, losers enter Bezirksliga.
- Teams placed 11th to 16th: Directly relegated to Bezirksliga.

== Winners and runners-up ==
The following teams have won or finished runners-up in the league:

**Season**	Champions	**Runners-up**
1988–89	FC Frankonia Thulba	**TG Höchberg**
1989–90	1. FC Haßfurt	**TV Helmstadt**
1990–91	Würzburger FV	FC Frankonia Thulba
1991–92	TV Helmstadt	ASV Rimpar
1992–93	FSV Teutonia Obernau	**DJK Waldberg**
1993–94	Alemannia Haibach	**TSV Grossbardorf**
1994–95	SV Erlenbach	**FT Schweinfurt**
1995–96	TSV Aubstadt	**1. FC Haßfurt** ^{1}
1996–97	TSV Grossbardorf	TSV Unterpleichfeld
1997–98	TSV Gerbrunn	**FC Gerolzhofen**
1998–99	Viktoria Kahl	**Alemannia Haibach**
1999–2000	TSV Sulzfeld	**TSV Aubstadt**
2000–01	1. FC Haßfurt	TSV Knetzgau
2001–02	SV Erlenbach	**Bayern Kitzingen**
2002–03	TSV Aidhausen	**FT Schweinfurt**
2003–04	SV Erlenbach	**Bayern Kitzingen**
2004–05	Kickers Würzburg	**TSV Lengenfeld** ^{+}
2005–06	TSV Karlburg	**SV Aschaffenburg-Damm**
2006–07	TSV Sulzfeld	**1. FC Haßfurt**
2007–08	TSV Aubstadt	**ASV Rimpar**
2008–09	FC Leinach	TSV Karlburg
2009–10	Bayern Kitzingen	**TuS Frammersbach**
2010–11	FC Gerolzhofen	**TSV Kleinrinderfeld** ^{+}
2011–12	ASV Rimpar	**TSV Karlburg**

- Promoted teams in **bold**.
- ^{+} Teams finished on equal points, decider needed to determine final position.
- ^{1} The SV Frankenwinheim (1996) was promoted after finishing third in its league.

=== Multiple winners ===
The following clubs have won the league more than once:

**Club**	**Wins**	**Years**
SV Erlenbach	3	1995, 2002, 2004
TSV Aubstadt	2	1996, 2008
TSV Sulzfeld	2	2000, 2007
1. FC Haßfurt	2	1990, 2001

== League placings ==
The final placings in the league since its interception:

Club	S	89	90	91	92	93	94	95	96	97	98	99	00	01	02	03	04	05	06	07	08	09	10	11	12
Würzburger FV	3	3	3	1	L	L	L	L	L	L	L	L	B	B	B	L	B	L	B	B	B	B	L	B	B
TSV Großbardorf	5		6	14			2	L	4	1	L	L	L	L	L	L	B	B	B	B	B	R	B	B	B
TG Höchberg	1	2	L	L	L	L	L	L	L	L	L	L	L	L	L	L	L	L	L	L	L	L	L	L	L
Alemannia Haibach	3					3	1	L	L	B	L	2	L	L	L	L	L	L	L	L	L	L	L	L	L
FT Schweinfurt	3	L	L	L	L	13		2	L	L	L	L	L	L	L	2	L	L	L	L	L	L	L	L	L
Würzburger Kickers	2	L	L	B	L	L	L	L	L	L	B	L	L	L	L	13		1	L	L	L	B	L	L	L
TSV Aubstadt	7							13	1	L	L	L	2	L	L	L	L	6	12	6	1	L	L	L	L
TuS Frammersbach	9														10	7	3	5	13	9	10	6	2	L	L
FC Gerolzhofen	11	10	5	8	6	15				3	2	L	17									13	9	1	L
TSV Kleinrinderfeld	9							3	13		8	7	11	14								5	8	2	L
ASV Rimpar	11	9	9	4	2	6	6	8	11	8	11	16							5	3	2	L	L	L	1
TSV Karlburg	9															4	6	9	1	L	7	2	3	3	2
FVgg Bayern Kitzingen	6														2	L	2	L	14			3	1	L	3
FC Blau-Weiss Leinach	4																				4	1	L	6	4
TSV Abtswind	5																			12	13	12	15		5
TSV Bergrheinfeld	8	12	8	15																	11	4	12	7	6
Würzburger FV II	5																			10	8	9	17		7
SV Erlenbach	18			7	4	7	5	1	L	11	3	4	5	8	1	L	1	L	L	5	12	8	7	13	8
TSV Lengfeld	7																5	2	L	L	6	7	11	5	9
SG Margetshöchheim	2																							11	10
FC Viktoria Kahl	2											1	L	L	L	L	L	L	L	L	L	L	L	L	11
FC Strahlungen	2																							12	12
SV Rödelmaier	10															9	7	10	7	4	9	11	6	9	13
TSV Uettingen	2																							4	14
SC Schollbrunn	3																						10	10	15
FSG Wiesentheid	5																				3	10	5	8	16
TSV Bad Königshofen	2																						13	14	
TSV Sulzfeld	5												1	L	L	L	L	L	3	1	L	L	4	15	
TSV Knetzgau	5													2	8	12	14						14		
1. FC Haßfurt	9	L	1	L	L	L	3	7	2	L	L	L	3	1	L	L	L	L	4	2	L	L	16		
1. FC Schweinfurt 05 II	5				11	11	11	14														14			
BSC Schweinheim	3																			8	5	15			
TSV Gochsheim	2														13							16			
TSV Keilberg	4																	3	10	11	14				
1. FC Bad Kissingen	5																12	4	11	7	15				
FC Kirchheim	6															11	10	7	6	13	16				
SV Aschaffenburg-Damm^{2}	1																		2	L					
TSV Pflaumheim	14						10	5	7	4	4	5	9	7	5	5	9	11	9	14					
FC Frankonia Thulba	5	1	L	2	13														8	15					
TSV Aidhausen^{4}	5											6	8	4	4	1	L	L	L						
TSV Röthlein	6								14						3	8	4	12	15						
TSV Unterpleichfeld	10					16			9	2	6	13	12	12	16			8	16						
TSV Maßbach	4									6	10	14						13							
Teutonia Obernau	7			2	3	1	L	L	L	L	L	L	L	L	9	3	8	14							
VfL Mönchberg	3										14						11	15							
DJK/TSV Stadtprozelten	2															10	13								
FC Bad Brückenau	1																15								
VfL Neustadt	8	15									12	9	13	10	7	6	16								
TSV Gerbrunn^{1}	1										1	L	L	L	L	B									
Eintracht Leidersbach	4												6	11	6	14									
FC Hammelburg	3													9	11	15									
FV Karlstadt	9		16					16		7	7	8	7	6	12	16									
Eintracht Straßbessenbach	4											3	4	3	14										
TSV Amorbach	3						15							5	15										
DJK Waldberg^{3}	3			10	12	2	L	L	L	L	L	L	L	L											
SV Heidingsfeld	5	L	L	L	L	L	L	B	L	5	5	12	10	13											
DJK Schweinfurt	1	L	L	L	L	L	L	L	L	L	L	L	L	15											
TSV Eßleben	1													16											
1. FC Fuchsstadt	2	14											14												
FC Bürgstadt	4									10	9	11	15												
FC Laufach	12	11	10	5	5	10	7	4	6	12	13	10	16												
SG Hettstadt	2									16		15													
TSVgg Mainaschaff	6					4	8	10	5	9	15														
SV Frankenwinheim	3							11	3	L	16														
TSV Güntersleben	6				7	5	4	12	8	13															
TSV Limbach	3		15						12	14															
SF Sailauf	2								10	15															
SV Bergtheim	7	7	13	12	14		12	9	15																
TV Helmstadt	6	4	2	L	1	L	9	6	16																
1. FC Zeil am Main	5	13			10	9	13	15																	
TV Marktheidenfeld	6	5	7	9	9	12	14																		
1. FC Eibelstadt	6	8	11	3	8	8	16																		
TV Haßfurt	1					14																			
VfR Goldbach	3		4	11	15																				
SF Holzhausen	2			6	16																				
SG Randersacker	1	L	L	13																					
TSV Eisingen	3	6	12	16																					
FC Ochsenfurt	1	L	14																						
DJK Wülfershausen	1	16																							

=== Key ===
Color	Key
R	Regionalliga Süd
B	Bayernliga
L	Landesliga Nord
1, 2, 3, ...	Bezirksoberliga
1	League champions
	Played at a league level below this league

- S = No of seasons in league (as of 2011-12)

=== Notes ===
- ^{1} In 2003, the TSV Gerbrunn withdrew from the Bayernliga.
- ^{2} In 2007, the SV Aschaffenburg-Damm withdrew from the Landesliga.
- ^{3} In 2001, the DJK Waldberg withdrew from the Landesliga.
- ^{4} In 2006, the TSV Aidhausen withdrew from the Landesliga.
