= 1. FC Sand =

German football club

- Full name: 1. Fußball-Club 1920 Sand am Main e.V.
- Founded: 1920
- Ground: Seestadion
- Capacity: 1,500
- Chairman: Egbert Mahr
- Manager: Dieter Schlereth
- League: Landesliga Bayern-Nordwest (VI)
- 2021–22: Bayernliga Nord, 18th of 18 (relegated)
Home colours	Away colours

1. FC Sand is a German association football club from the town of Sand am Main, Bavaria.

== History ==
The club was established on 27 March 1920 and first came to note with their rise to the Landesliga Bayern-Nord in 1981. The club lasted for only three seasons at this level but made an immediate return after relegation. After returning to the Landesliga in 1985, the first six seasons were a constant struggle for survival. The club greatly improved from 1991 onwards and would only finish in the bottom half of the table on one more occasion, in 2008. Nevertheless, it took the side until 2000 to achieve another promotion when they captured the title in the Landesliga and were promoted to the Bayernliga (IV) where they spent two seasons (2000–02) before returning to the Landesliga.

At the end of the 2011–12 season the club qualified directly for the newly expanded Bayernliga after finishing sixth in the Landesliga. It lasted for only one season at this level before being relegated again back to the Landesliga. After two seasons at this level the club finished runners-up in the league in 2015 and qualified for the promotion round. After two victories over SpVgg Selbitz Sand earned promotion back to the Bayernliga.

== Honours ==
The club's honours:

- Landesliga Bayern-Nord
  - Champions: 2000
  - Runners-up: 2009
- Landesliga Bayern-Nordwest
  - Runners-up: 2015
- Unterfranken Cup
  - Winners: 2004

== Recent managers ==
Recent managers of the club:

Manager	Start	Finish
Erwin Albert	2008	June 2014
Bernd Eigner	June 2014	Present

== Recent seasons ==
The recent season-by-season performance of the club:

Season	Division	Tier	Position
1999–2000	Landesliga Bayern-Nord	V	1st ↑
2000–01	Bayernliga	IV	11th
2001–02	Bayernliga	IV	16th ↓
2002–03	Landesliga Bayern-Nord	V	9th
2003–04	Landesliga Bayern-Nord	V	3rd
2004–05	Landesliga Bayern-Nord	V	3rd
2005–06	Landesliga Bayern-Nord	V	3rd
2006–07	Landesliga Bayern-Nord	V	3rd
2007–08	Landesliga Bayern-Nord	V	10th
2008–09	Landesliga Bayern-Nord	VI	2nd
2009–10	Landesliga Bayern-Nord	VI	6th
2010–11	Landesliga Bayern-Nord	VI	3rd
2011–12	Landesliga Bayern-Nord	VI	6th ↑
2012–13	Bayernliga Nord	V	17th ↓
2013–14	Landesliga Bayern-Nordwest	VI	5th
2014–15	Landesliga Bayern-Nordwest	VI	2nd ↑
2015–16	Bayernliga Nord	V	9th
2016–17	Bayernliga Nord	V	7th
2017–18	Bayernliga Nord	V	15th
2018–19	Bayernliga Nord	V	14th
2019–21	Bayernliga Nord	V	15th
2021–22	Bayernliga Nord	V	18th ↓
2022–23	Landesliga Bayern-Nordwest		

- With the introduction of the Bezirksoberligas in 1988 as the new fifth tier, below the Landesligas, all leagues below dropped one tier. With the introduction of the Regionalligas in 1994 and the 3. Liga in 2008 as the new third tier, below the 2. Bundesliga, all leagues below dropped one tier. With the establishment of the Regionalliga Bayern as the new fourth tier in Bavaria in 2012 the Bayernliga was split into a northern and a southern division, the number of Landesligas expanded from three to five and the Bezirksoberligas abolished. All leagues from the Bezirksligas onward were elevated one tier.

↑ Promoted	↓ Relegated
