= 1. FC Haßfurt =

- Founded: 15 January 1917
- Ground: Stadion an der Flutbrücke
- League: Kreisliga Schweinfurt 2 (VIII)
- 2015–16: 4th
Home colours	Away colours

The 1. FC Haßfurt is a German association football club from the city of Haßfurt, Bavaria.

== History ==
The club was formed in 1917 under its current name, 1. FC Haßfurt.

The 1. FC Haßfurt first appeared above the local football level in 1957, when it achieved promotion to the Amateurliga Bayern-Nord (III), the northern division of the highest state league. It could not manage to hold this level in its first season 1957–58 and was relegated straight back to the 2. Amateurliga Unterfranken.

Bouncing straight back in 1959, Haßfurt had a much better second try in the Amateurliga, coming sixth in 1959–60. A strong performance the season after saw the club winning its league and earning promotion to the 2. Oberliga Süd, then the second tier of league football in Southern Germany. While the club easily won its promotion round, unbeaten in six games versus Offenburger FV, TSV Heusenstamm and Salamander Kornwestheim, it could only obtain a licence for the second division on appeal.

In the same league with some well-known football clubs from the south of Germany, like Hessen Kassel, FSV Frankfurt and Stuttgarter Kickers, the team performed well, earning a tenth place in its first season. Its second year in the league was to be the last edition of the competition due to the formation of the Bundesliga. A fourteenth place was not enough for the 1. FC Haßfurt to earn a place in the new tier two Regionalliga Süd and it had to return to the now single-division Amateurliga Bayern.

Upon return to the third tier, the club continued to perform well, earning a third place in its first year. After some mixed results, the team repeated this performance in 1968–69. From there, however, the club went downhill, resulting in relegation from the Amateurliga to the Landesliga Bayern-Nord (IV) in 1972. After three unimpressive seasons in this league, Haßfurt took out the title in 1975–76 and returned to the third division.

Settling in its first season, the second, 1977–78, proved to be a highlight in the club's history. Winning the division, one point ahead of MTV Ingolstadt, the 1. FC Haßfurt was directly promoted to the 2. Bundesliga Süd. Financial reasons however forced the club to not accept this offer and Ingolstadt found itself promoted instead. The club had one more outstanding season after this, in 1979–80, when it finished second in the league to FC Augsburg. The season after, it slipped to seventeenth place, and was relegated from what was now the Amateur-Oberliga Bayern.

The 1. FC Haßfurt did not manage to return to its successful past after this, fluctuating between the Landesliga Bayern-Nord and the league below, the Bezirksliga Unterfranken and later the Bezirksoberliga Unterfranken. The club found itself relegated from the Landesliga five times in the next two decades, in 1985, 1989, 1993, 1999 and 2005, only to return each time.

Having returned to the Landesliga in 2007, the club played in this league until 2009, when a 17th-place finish meant another relegation. The club continued its descend through the leagues, playing in the tier-eight Bezirksliga in 2011–12, where it suffered another relegation, now to the Kreisliga Schweinfurt.

== Honours ==
The club's honours:

=== League ===
- Amateurliga Bayern (III)
  - Champions: 1978
- Amateurliga Bayern-Nord (III)
  - Champions: 1961
- 2. Amateurliga Unterfranken West (IV)
  - Champions: (2) 1954, 1957
- 2. Amateurliga Unterfranken Ost (IV)
  - Champions: 1959
- Landesliga Bayern-Nord (IV)
  - Champions: 1976
- Bezirksoberliga Unterfranken (V-VI)
  - Champions: 1990, 2001
  - Runners-up: (2) 1996, 2007

== Recent seasons ==
The recent season-by-season performance of the club:

Season	Division	Tier	Position
1999–2000	Bezirksoberliga Unterfranken	VI	3rd
2000–01	Bezirksoberliga Unterfranken	VI	1st ↑
2001–02	Landesliga Bayern-Nord	V	4th
2002–03	Landesliga Bayern-Nord	V	11th
2003–04	Landesliga Bayern-Nord	V	11th
2004–05	Landesliga Bayern-Nord	V	17th ↓
2005–06	Bezirksoberliga Unterfranken	VI	4th
2006–07	Bezirksoberliga Unterfranken	VI	2nd ↑
2007–08	Landesliga Bayern-Nord	V	16th
2008–09	Landesliga Bayern-Nord	VI	17th ↓
2009–10	Bezirksoberliga Unterfranken	VII	16th ↓
2010–11	Bezirksliga Unterfranken 2	VIII	5th
2011–12	Bezirksliga Unterfranken 2	VIII	14th ↓
2012–13	Kreisliga Schweinfurt 2	VIII	8th
2013–14	Kreisliga Schweinfurt 2	VIII	5th
2014–15	Kreisliga Schweinfurt 2	VIII	11th
2015–16	Kreisliga Schweinfurt 2	VIII	4th
2016–17	Kreisliga Schweinfurt 2	VIII	

- With the introduction of the Bezirksoberligas in 1988 as the new fifth tier, below the Landesligas, all leagues below dropped one tier. With the introduction of the Regionalligas in 1994 and the 3. Liga in 2008 as the new third tier, below the 2. Bundesliga, all leagues below dropped one tier. With the establishment of the Regionalliga Bayern as the new fourth tier in Bavaria in 2012 the Bayernliga was split into a northern and a southern division, the number of Landesligas expanded from three to five and the Bezirksoberligas abolished. All leagues from the Bezirksligas onwards were elevated one tier.

↑ Promoted	↓ Relegated

== DFB Cup appearances ==
The club has qualified for the first round of the German Cup only once:

Season	Round	Date	Home	Away	Result	Attendance
1981–82 DFB-Pokal	First round	28 August 1981	1. FC Haßfurt	1. FC Nürnberg	0–2	5,000

== Former players ==
- Ludwig Müller (1961–64), former German international (1968–69)
- Heinz-Herbert Kreh top-scorer in the Amateurliga Bayern-Nord (1960 – 36 goals), the 2, Oberliga Süd (1962 – 30 goals) and the Amateurliga Bayern (1965 – 38 goals and 1966 – 30 goals), also played 19 times for the German national amateur side
