= Sandberg, Bavaria =

- Municipality
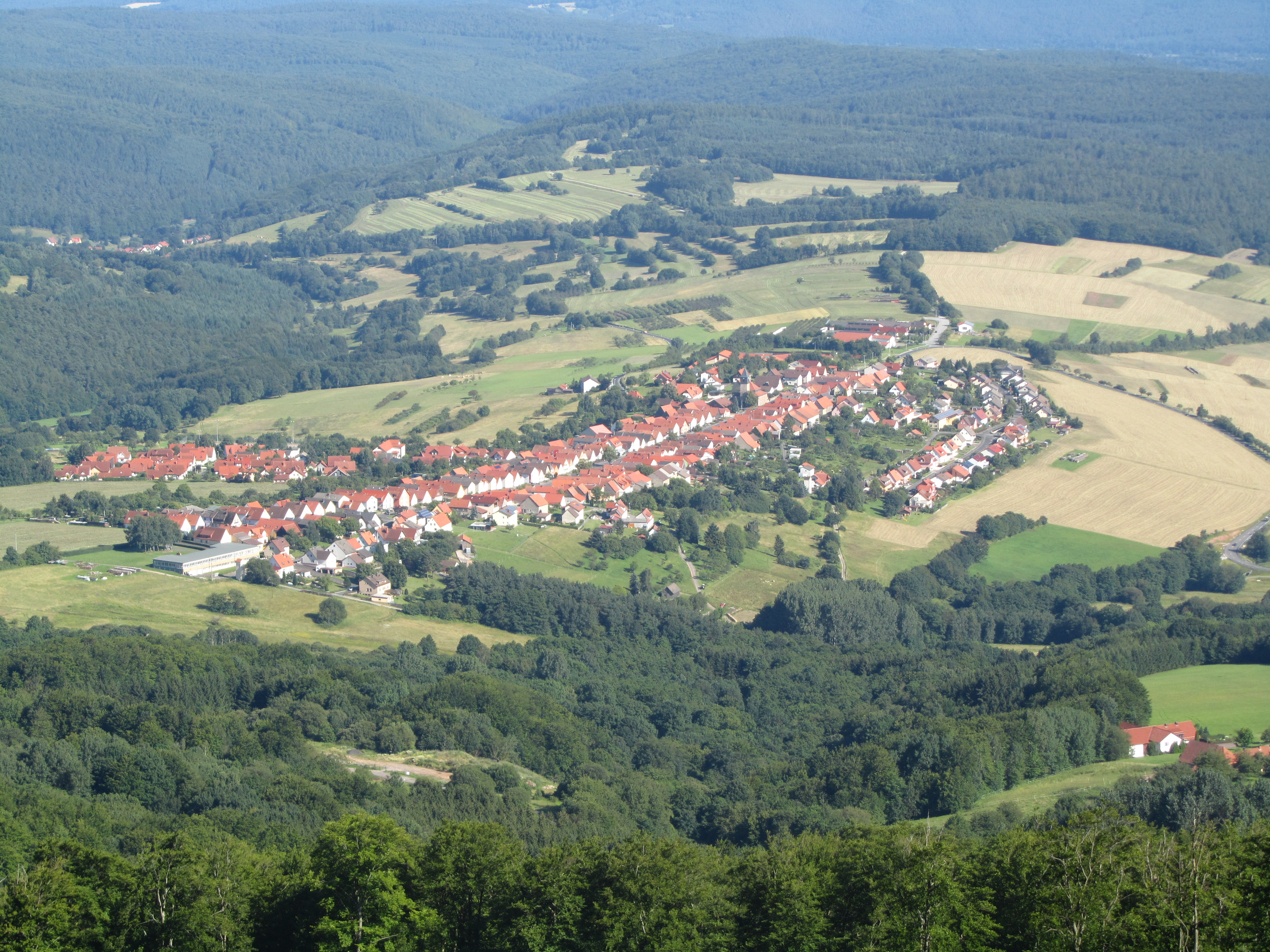
- Sandberg seen from Kreuzberg

- Coat of arms

- Location of Sandberg, Bavaria within Rhön-Grabfeld district
- Interactive map of Sandberg, Bavaria
- Location within Germany Location within Bavaria
- Coordinates: 50°21′N 10°0′E
- Country: Germany
- State: Bavaria
- Admin. region: Unterfranken
- District: Rhön-Grabfeld

Government
  - Mayor (2020–26): Sonja Reubelt

Area
  - Total: 28.04 km^{2} (10.83 sq mi)
- Elevation: 452–542 m (1,483–1,778 ft)

Population (2025-12-31)
  - Total: 2,291
  - Density: 81.70/km^{2} (211.6/sq mi)
- Time zone: UTC+01:00 (CET)
  - Summer (DST): UTC+02:00 (CEST)
- Postal codes: 97657
- Dialling codes: 09701
- Vehicle registration: NES
- Website: www.sandberg-rhoen.de

Sandberg (German pronunciation: [ˈzantˌbɛʁk]) is a municipality in the district of Rhön-Grabfeld in Bavaria in Germany.

== Geography ==
=== Location ===
Sandberg lies within the Main-Rhön regional planning region.

=== Subdivisions ===
Sandberg is divided into nine municipal subdivisions or villages:

- Altmühle
- Kilianshof
- Langenleiten
- Neumühle
- Sandberg
- Schmalwasser
- Simonshöfe
- Waldberg
- Ziegelhütte
