= Würzburger FV =

FV 04 Würzburg
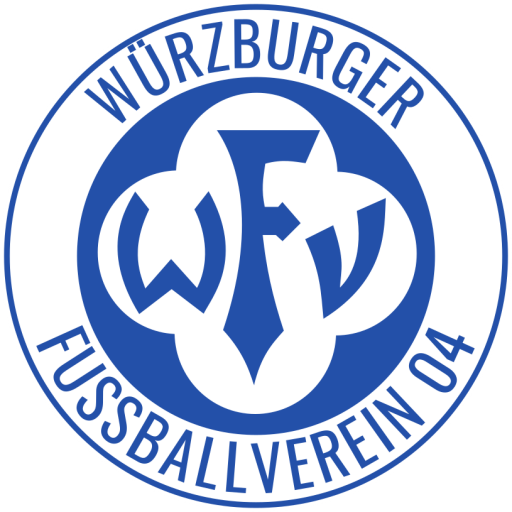
- Full name: Würzburger Fußball-Verein 04 e.V.
- Nickname: FVW
- Founded: 1904
- Ground: Sepp-Endres-Sportanlage
- Capacity: 3,500
- Chairman: Andrea Behr
- Manager: Andreas Eisenmann
- League: Bayernliga Nord (V)
- 2025–26: Bayernliga Nord, 13th of 18
- Website: www.wuerzburgerfv.de
| Home colours | Away colours |

FV 04 Würzburg is a German association football club from the city of Würzburg, Bavaria founded in 1904 as 1. Würzburger FV 04. The club emerged as WFV in 1923 after leaving a short-lived union formed with a gymnastics club.

== History ==
=== 1904-1981: FV 04 Würzburg ===
The team has played as an unheralded local amateur side for most of its existence. From 1927 to 1933, they played in the tier-one Bezirksliga Bayern. In 1933–34 they spent a single season in the top flight Gauliga Bayern, one of sixteen premier divisions formed in the re-organization of German football under the Third Reich in 1933. Towards the end of World War II, WFV was forced into a merger with Kickers Würzburg to play together as the wartime side (Kriegspielgemeinschaft) KSG Würzburg. The unified club spent two seasons in last place in the Gauliga Bayern (Gruppe Nord). Play was interrupted as the war progressed and the team was disbanded at the end of the conflict.

WFV was re-established after the war and returned to playing anonymously in the lower amateur divisions. It became a permanent fixture in the tier-three Amateurliga Bayern from 1950 onwards. After not qualifying for the new single-division Amateurliga in 1963, the club declined somewhat, spending time in the tier-four Landesliga Bayern-Nord, interrupted by a Bayernliga appearance from 1964 to 1966. In 1970, the club finally returned to the third division more permanently. They broke through to the 2nd Bundesliga Süd 1976 in spite of a second-place finish and a 0:2 playoff loss to Wacker München when Wacker declined promotion.

Würzburg's four-year-long turn in the second division was a difficult struggle and they were relegated in 1980 after a 21st place finish. Their descent to the Oberliga Bayern (III) ended with another last place finish and was then promptly followed by the financial collapse of the club which owed its creditors over 2.5 million Marks. WFV sold its stadium to local rival DJK Würzburg to help clear its debt before the club was folded up in May 1981.

=== 1981-2021: Würzburger FV ===
The members immediately formed the current club Würzburger FV which began play in the depths of the tenth division Kreisklasse C. They have since played their way back to the Oberliga Bayern (IV) where they finished a strong third in 2005–06. During their climb the team earned an appearance in the opening round of the 2001–02 German Cup tournament, but were thrashed 0:10 by then Bundesliga side 1860 Munich.

In the 2007–08 season, the club successfully battled against relegation, finishing 14th. The following season, 2008–09, saw the return of the Würzburg derby after Kickers Würzburg gained promotion to the Oberliga. The two clubs had not played against each other at this level since 1981 and have last met in a league game in the 1998–99 season in the Landesliga.

WFV experienced a difficult 2008–09 season and had to continue its fight for Bayernliga survival in the post-season, having finished on equal points with SV Seligenporten (15th) and TSV Rain am Lech (16th) and therefore requiring a set of deciders to be played. The club lost both games and was relegated back to the Landesliga, alongside Kickers.

In 2009–10 they took the Landesliga championship and promoted to Oberliga Bayern once more. At the end of the 2011–12 season the club managed to qualify for the promotion round to the new Regionalliga Bayern and advanced to the second round after defeating SpVgg Selbitz convincingly in two games. In this round the club went out to SV Heimstetten on away goals after losing 1–0 in Heimstetten and winning 2–1 at home, thereby remaining in the Bayernliga. The club also missed out on a chance to play on the same level again with local rival Würzburger Kickers, who achieved promotion to the Regionalliga after a Landesliga championship.

=== Since October 2021: FV 04 Würzburg ===
After a merger with "Würzburger Förderverein 04 e.V" the club took back its traditional name "FV 04 Würzburg".

== Honours ==
The club's honours:

=== League ===
- Bayernliga (III)
  - Runners-up: (2) 1975, 1976
- Landesliga Bayern-Nord
  - Champions: (6) 1964 (IV), 1970 (IV), 1999 (V), 2003 (V), 2005 (V), 2010 (VI)
  - Runners-up: (3) 1969, 1997, 1998
- 2nd Amateurliga Unterfranken Ost (IV)
  - Champions: 1960
- Bezirksoberliga Unterfranken (V)
  - Champions: 1991

=== Cup ===
- Bavarian Cup
  - Runners-up: (2) 2001, 2007
- Unterfranken Cup
  - Winners: (2) 2001, 2007

=== Youth ===
- Bavarian Under 19 championship
  - Runners-up: 1967

== Recent seasons ==
The recent season-by-season performance of the club:

| Season | Division | Tier | Position |
|---|---|---|---|
| 1999–2000 | Bayernliga | IV | 13th |
| 2000–01 | Bayernliga | IV | 13th |
| 2001–02 | Bayernliga | IV | 15th ↓ |
| 2002–03 | Landesliga Bayern-Nord | V | 1st ↑ |
| 2003–04 | Bayernliga | IV | 16th ↓ |
| 2004–05 | Landesliga Bayern-Nord | V | 1st ↑ |
| 2005–06 | Bayernliga | IV | 3rd |
| 2006–07 | Bayernliga | IV | 9th |
| 2007–08 | Bayernliga | IV | 14th |
| 2008–09 | Bayernliga | V | 14th ↓ |
| 2009–10 | Landesliga Bayern-Nord | VI | 1st ↑ |
| 2010–11 | Bayernliga | V | 5th |
| 2011–12 | Bayernliga | V | 12th |
| 2012–13 | Bayernliga Nord | V | 5th |
| 2013–14 | Bayernliga Nord | V | 10th |
| 2014–15 | Bayernliga Nord | V | 11th |
| 2015–16 | Bayernliga Nord | V | 12th |
| 2016–17 | Bayernliga Nord | V | 12th |
| 2017–18 | Bayernliga Nord | V | 3rd |
| 2018–19 | Bayernliga Nord | V | 3rd |
| 2019–21 | Bayernliga Nord | V | 8th |
| 2021–22 | Bayernliga Nord | V | 14th |
| 2022–23 | Bayernliga Nord | V | 10th |
| 2023–24 | Bayernliga Nord | V | 17th |
| 2024–25 | Bayernliga Nord | V | 10th |
| 2025–26 | Bayernliga Nord | V | 13th |

- With the introduction of the Bezirksoberligas in 1988 as the new fifth tier, below the Landesligas, all leagues below dropped one tier. With the introduction of the Regionalligas in 1994 and the 3. Liga in 2008 as the new third tier, below the 2. Bundesliga, all leagues below dropped one tier. With the establishment of the Regionalliga Bayern as the new fourth tier in Bavaria in 2012 the Bayernliga was split into a northern and a southern division, the number of Landesligas expanded from three to five and the Bezirksoberligas abolished. All leagues from the Bezirksligas onward were elevated one tier.

| ↑ Promoted | ↓ Relegated |

== The Würzburg league derby since 1963 ==
The 2009–10 season was the 19th time, the two most prominent clubs from Würzburg, Würzburger FV and FC Würzburger Kickers, played in the same league since 1963. In this time, the derby was played on professional level only once, in the 1977–78 2. Bundesliga Süd season.

| Season | League | Teams | Home | Away |
|---|---|---|---|---|
| 1964–65 | Amateurliga Bayern | Würzburger FV – Würzburger Kickers | 2–1 | 1–5 |
| 1965–66 | Amateurliga Bayern | Würzburger FV – Würzburger Kickers | 0–1 | 1–1 |
| 1970–71 | Amateurliga Bayern | Würzburger FV – Würzburger Kickers | 3–1 | 2–1 |
| 1971–72 | Amateurliga Bayern | Würzburger FV – Würzburger Kickers | 1–3 | 4–1 |
| 1972–73 | Amateurliga Bayern | Würzburger FV – Würzburger Kickers | 1–0 | 3–1 |
| 1973–74 | Amateurliga Bayern | Würzburger FV – Würzburger Kickers | 2–1 | 0–0 |
| 1974–75 | Amateurliga Bayern | Würzburger FV – Würzburger Kickers | 3–0 | 1–0 |
| 1975–76 | Amateurliga Bayern | Würzburger FV – Würzburger Kickers | 3–0 | 1–1 |
| 1977–78 | 2. Bundesliga Süd | Würzburger FV – Würzburger Kickers | 4–0 | 2–2 |
| 1980–81 | Amateur Oberliga Bayern | Würzburger FV – Würzburger Kickers | 0–0 | 1–1 |
| 1991–92 | Landesliga Bayern-Nord | Würzburger FV – Würzburger Kickers | 1–2 | 1–3 |
| 1992–93 | Landesliga Bayern-Nord | Würzburger FV – Würzburger Kickers | 5–1 | 3–0 |
| 1993–94 | Landesliga Bayern-Nord | Würzburger FV – Würzburger Kickers | 3–3 | 0–5 |
| 1994–95 | Landesliga Bayern-Nord | Würzburger FV – Würzburger Kickers | 4–1 | 1–5 |
| 1996–96 | Landesliga Bayern-Nord | Würzburger FV – Würzburger Kickers | 3–0 | 1–1 |
| 1996–97 | Landesliga Bayern-Nord | Würzburger FV – Würzburger Kickers | 3–2 | 0–0 |
| 1998–99 | Landesliga Bayern-Nord | Würzburger FV – Würzburger Kickers | 4–0 | 0–1 |
| 2008–09 | Bayernliga | Würzburger FV – Würzburger Kickers | 1–2 | 2–5 |
| 2009–10 | Landesliga Bayern-Nord | Würzburger FV – Würzburger Kickers | 4–1 | 0–2 |
| 2012–13 | Bavarian Cup | Würzburger FV – Würzburger Kickers | 5–4 (pen) | |
| 2018–19 | Bavarian Cup | Würzburger FV – Würzburger Kickers | 0–4 | |

== DFB Cup appearances ==
The club has qualified for the first round of the German Cup a number of times:

| Season | Round | Date | Home | Away | Result | Attendance |
|---|---|---|---|---|---|---|
| DFB-Pokal 1977–78 | First round | 29 July 1977 | FV Würzburg 04 | Jahn Regensburg | 1–0 | |
| DFB-Pokal 1977–78 | Second round | 20 August 1977 | TuS Langerwehe | FV Würzburg 04 | 1–0 aet | |
| DFB-Pokal 1978–79 | First round | 5 August 1978 | FV Würzburg 04 | Hertha BSC Berlin | 0–2 aet | 6,000 |
| DFB-Pokal 1979–80 | First round | 25 August 1979 | FC Vilshofen | FV Würzburg 04 | 2–3 aet | |
| DFB-Pokal 1979–80 | Second round | 29 September 1979 | FC Homburg | FV Würzburg 04 | 5–0 | |
| DFB-Pokal 1980–81 | First round | 31 August 1980 | ASC Dudweiler | FV Würzburg 04 | 0–1 | |
| DFB-Pokal 1980–81 | Second round | 4 October 1980 | Hertha BSC Berlin | FV Würzburg 04 | 4–1 | |
| DFB-Pokal 2001–02 | First round | 25 August 2001 | Würzburger FV | TSV 1860 Munich | 0–10 | 10,100 |
| DFB-Pokal 2007–08 | First round | 5 August 2007 | Würzburger FV | VfL Wolfsburg | 0–4 | 11,200 |

Source:"DFB-Pokal" (in German). Weltfussball.de.

== Literature ==
- Siegfried Breunig: 75 Jahre 1. Würzburger Fußballverein 04 e.V. Max-Verlag, 1979.
- Elfriede Hüttner: Studien zur Geschichte des 1. Würzburger Fußballvereins 04. 1979.
