= Landesliga Bayern-Nord =

- Founded: 1963
- Folded: 2012
- Country: Germany
- State: Bavaria
- Level on pyramid: Level 6
- Promotion to: Bayernliga
- Relegation to: Bezirksoberliga Unterfranken; Bezirksoberliga Oberfranken
- Last champions: Kickers Würzburg (2011–12)

The Landesliga Bayern-Nord (English: State league Bavaria-North) was the sixth tier of the German football league system in northern Bavaria. Until the introduction of the 3. Liga in 2008 it was the fifth tier of the league system, until the introduction of the Regionalligas in 1994 the fourth tier.

The winner of the Landesliga Nord was automatically qualified for the Bayernliga, the runners-up needed to compete with the runners-up of Landesliga Bayern-Süd and Landesliga Bayern-Mitte and the 15th placed team of the Bayernliga for another promotion spot.

The league was disbanded in 2012, when the Regionalliga Bayern was introduced as the new fourth tier of the German league system in Bavaria. Below this league, the Bayernliga was expanded to two divisions while the number of Landesligas grew from three to five divisions. However, none of the new leagues carried the name Landesliga Bayern-Nord, with the Landesliga Bayern-Nordwest coming closest in territorial coverage.

== Overview ==
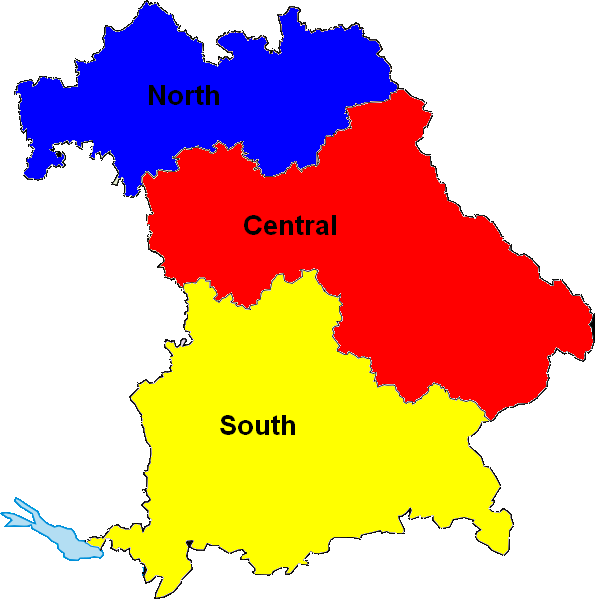
The Landesligas from 1963 to 2012.

The Landesligen in Bayern were formed in 1963, in place of the 2nd Amateurligas, which operated below the Bayernliga until then. In the region of the Landesliga Nord, the 2nd Amateurligen were split into three groups, Oberfranken, Unterfranken-Ost and Unterfranken-West. The league was formed from eighteen clubs, seven of them from the Amateurligas (III) and thirteen from the 2nd Amateurligas (IV).

In the first eighteen seasons, up until 1980, only the league champions were promoted to the Bayernliga. This was altered in 1981, when the three Landesliga runners-up were given the opportunity to earn promotion, too, via a promotion round. It took 14 attempts by a Landesliga Nord club however, to actually achieve promotion through this way, which VfL Frohnlach finally did in 1994. The Bavarian football association actually stipulates in its rules and regulations that every league champion has to be promoted, unless it declines to do so, and every runners-up has to have the opportunity to earn promotion, too.

Below the league, the Bezirksligas were set as the fifth tier of league football, until 1988, when the Bezirksoberligas were formed. In the first years, four teams were promoted from the Bezirksligas, two from each region. In the 1980s, this number was increased to five clubs for a time. The Landesliga Nord was now fed by the two Bezirksoberligen of Unterfranken and Oberfranken. The winner of those were automatically promoted, the runners-up played-off for another promotion spot, the loser of this game then played a decider with the 15th placed team of Landesliga to determine the winner of the last available spot in the Landesliga.

For the most part of its history, the league has operated on a strength of eighteen clubs, only occasionally diverting from this when the number of teams relegated from the Bayernliga to it was more than one. With the changes in the league system there were, on occasion, two automatical promotion places available to each of the Landesligs, like in the seasons 1993–94 and 2007–08.

Clubs based in the border region to Hesse traditionally play in the Hessen football league system rather than the Bavarian Football League System. Notable examples of this are Viktoria Aschaffenburg and FC Bayern Alzenau who both currently play in the Oberliga Hessen. The later only left Landesliga Nord to do so in 1992.

=== Disbanding ===
The Bavarian football federation carried out drastic changes to the league system at the end of the 2011–12 season. With the already decided introduction of the Regionalliga Bayern from 2012–13, it also placed two Bayernligas below the new league as the new fifth tier of the German league system. Below those, five Landesligas instead of the existing three were set, which would be geographically divided to limit travel and increase the number of local derbies.

The clubs from the Landesliga Bayern-Nord joined the following leagues:

- Champions and runners-up: Promotion round to the Regionalliga, winners to the Regionalliga, losers to the Bayernliga.
- Teams placed 3rd to 8th: Directly qualified to the Bayernliga.
- Teams placed 9th to 15th: Promotion round to the Bayernliga, winners to the Bayernliga, losers to the Landesliga.
- Teams placed 16th or worse: Directly qualified to the Landesliga.

== Founding members ==
When the league was formed in 1963 as the new fourth tier of the Bavarian league system in Upper Franconia and Lower Franconia, in place of the 2nd Amateurligas, it consisted of the following eighteen clubs from the following leagues:

- From the Amateurliga Nordbayern
  - FV Würzburg 04
  - 1. FC Bayreuth
  - 1. FC Michelau
  - ATS Kulmbach
  - TSV Gochsheim
  - VfB Rehau
  - Wacker Marktredwitz
- From the 2nd Amateurliga Unterfranken-West
  - SV Großwallstadt
  - TSV Lohr am Main
  - Frankonia Mechenhard
- From the 2nd Amateurliga Unterfranken-Ost
  - Bayern Kitzingen
  - Post SV Würzburg
  - 1. FC Schweinfurt 05 II
- From the 2nd Amateurliga Oberfranken-West
  - SC Sylvia Ebersdorf
  - ASV Gaustadt
- From the 2nd Amateurliga Oberfranken-Ost
  - VfB Bayreuth
  - VfB Arzberg
  - SpVgg Hof

The clubs in the two Amateurligas placed seventh or better were admitted to the new Amateurliga Bayern, all others went to the new Landesligas. The top-three teams in the four regional 2nd Amateurligas were each admitted to the Landesliga Bayern-Nord. In the case of the 2nd Amateurliga Oberfranken-West, the league champion, the reserve team of VfL Neustadt, was disbanded and the fourth place club in the league, TSV Küps, was not permitted to take its place.

== Top-three of the Landesliga ==
The following teams have finished in the top-three in the league:

**Season**	Champions	**Runners–up**	**Third**
1963–64	FV Würzburg 04	SC Sylvia Ebersdorf	1. FC Bayreuth
1964–65	1. FC Bayreuth	TSV Donndorf-Eckersdorf	SC Sylvia Ebersdorf
1965–66	SpVgg Hof	VfL Neustadt	FC Münchberg
1966–67	VfB Coburg	1. FC Bayreuth	FV Würzburg 04
1967–68	FC Münchberg	1. FC Bayreuth	FC Kronach
1968–69	1. FC Bayreuth	FV Würzburg 04	1. FC Bamberg
1969–70	FV Würzburg 04	Wacker Marktredwitz	TSV Mainaschaff
1970–71	FC Kronach	1. FC Bayreuth	FC Münchberg
1971–72	1. FC Bayreuth	BSC Saas Bayreuth	VfB Coburg
1972–73	VfB Coburg	ATS Kulmbach	VfB Helmbrechts
1973–74	ATS Kulmbach	VfB Helmbrechts	1. FC Lichtenfels
1974–75	1. FC Bamberg	TSV Trebgast	SpVgg Hof
1975–76	1. FC Haßfurt	BSV 98 Bayreuth	TSV Trebgast
1976–77	TSV Trebgast	BSV 98 Bayreuth	VfB Helmbrechts
1977–78	TSV Hirschaid	VfL Neustadt	BSV 98 Bayreuth
1978–79	VfB Helmbrechts	SV Erlenbach	SV Hallstadt
1979–80	VfL Frohnlach	SV Erlenbach	TSV Hirschaid
1980–81	1. FC Bamberg	VfB Coburg	FC Bayern Hof
1981–82	VfB Coburg	FT Schweinfurt	TSV Trebgast
1982–83	FC Bayern Hof	SV Heidingsfeld	1. FC Haßfurt
1983–84	FC Schweinfurt 05	SV Heidingsfeld	VfB Helmbrechts
1984–85	SV Heidingsfeld	VfB Helmbrechts	FC Bayern Hof
1985–86	FC Schweinfurt 05	VfB Helmbrechts	TSV Trebgast
1986–87	FC Kronach	VfB Helmbrechts	FC Bayern Hof
1987–88	FC Bayern Hof	VfB Helmbrechts	SC Weismain
1988–89	VfB Helmbrechts	SV Memmelsdorf	Wacker Marktredwitz
1989–90	Kickers Würzburg	DJK Schweinfurt	SV Heidingsfeld
1990–91	SC 08 Bamberg	VfL Frohnlach	FC Bayern Hof
1991–92	VfL Frohnlach	SV Heidingsfeld	FC Bayern Hof
1992–93	VfB Helmbrechts	FC Bayern Hof	SV Heidingsfeld
1993–94	FC Bayern Hof	**SV Heidingsfeld**	**VfL Frohnlach**
1994–95	SC Weismain	Alemannia Haibach	SpVgg Stegaurach
1995–96	SpVgg Stegaurach	**Alemannia Haibach**	FV Würzburg 04
1996–97	Kickers Würzburg	FV Würzburg 04	Teutonia Obernau
1997–98	SpVgg Bayreuth	FV Würzburg 04	1. FC Sand
1998–99	FV Würzburg 04	DJK Waldberg	TSV Großbardorf
1999–2000	1. FC Sand	SpVgg Bayreuth	VfL Frohnlach
2000–01	SpVgg Bayreuth	TSV Großbardorf	VfL Frohnlach
2001–02	TSV Gerbrunn	VfL Frohnlach	TSV Großbardorf
2002–03	FV Würzburg 04	**TSV Großbardorf**	VfL Frohnlach
2003–04	VfL Frohnlach	1. FC Bamberg	1. FC Sand
2004–05	FV Würzburg 04	SpVgg Bayern Hof	1. FC Sand
2005–06	SpVgg Bayern Hof	**1. FC Bamberg**	1. FC Sand
2006–07	FC Schweinfurt 05	Alemannia Haibach	1. FC Sand
2007–08	VfL Frohnlach	**Kickers Würzburg**	SV Friesen
2008–09	SV Memmelsdorf	1. FC Sand	Alemannia Haibach
2009–10	Würzburger FV	**FC Schweinfurt 05**	TG Höchberg
2010–11	VfL Frohnlach	SpVgg Selbitz	1. FC Sand
2011–12	Kickers Würzburg	**TSV Aubstadt**	**SpVgg Selbitz**

- Promoted teams in **bold**.
- The Bavarian football association requires deciders to be played when two teams are on equal points at the end of the season to determine promotion/relegation. While such games are common–place in the other two Landesligas, the Landesliga Nord never yet, as of 2009, had two teams finish on equal points on a promotion or promotion play–off spot.

=== Multiple winners ===
The following clubs have won the league more than once:

**Club**	**Wins**	**Years**
Würzburger FV	6	1964, 1970, 1999, 2003, 2005, 2010
VfL Frohnlach	5	1980, 1992, 2004, 2008, 2011
SpVgg Bayern Hof	4	1983, 1988, 1994, 2006
Kickers Würzburg	3	1990, 1997, 2012
FC Schweinfurt 05	3	1984, 1986, 2007
VfB Helmbrechts	3	1979, 1989, 1993
VfB Coburg	3	1967, 1973, 1982
1. FC Bayreuth	3	1965, 1969, 1972
SpVgg Bayreuth	2	1998, 2001
FC Kronach	2	1971, 1982
1. FC Bamberg	2	1975, 1981

== All-time table 1963–2012 ==
The 1. FC Sand holds top spot in the all-time table of the Landesliga Nord, with 1,456 points from 928 games. Number two is the FT Schweinfurt, 46 points behind but with the record number of games, 1,060. Third place goes to 1. FC Bamberg. The last place, number 131, is the FC Wacker Trailsdorf on nine points. For the 2011–12 season, only one team joined the league that hasn't played at this level before, the TSV Kleinrinderfeld.

Pos.	Club	Seasons	M	W	D	L	GF	GA	P
1	1. FC Sand	28	962	422	245	295	1764	1352	1511
2	FT Schweinfurt	31	1060	408	241	411	2018	2047	1465
3	1. FC Bamberg	24	818	369	191	258	1620	1245	1298
4–128	125 clubs								
129	SV Frankenwinheim	1	34	5	5	24	41	92	20
130	TSV Scheuerfeld	1	36	5	1	30	40	121	16
131	FC Wacker Trailsdorf	1	34	2	3	29	30	105	9

== League placings since 1988–89 ==
The complete list of clubs and placings in the league since the 1988–89 season:

Club	S	89	90	91	92	93	94	95	96	97	98	99	00	01	02	03	04	05	06	07	08	09	10	11	12
FC Bayern Alzenau ^{3}	9	5	8	8	12	H	H	H	H	H	H	H	H	H	H	H	H	H	H	H	H	H	R	H	R
SpVgg Bayern Hof ^{9}	13	B	B	3	3	2	1	B	B	B	B	B	B	B	B	B	B	2	1	B	B	B	B	B	B
TSV Großbardorf	7							16			5	3	8	2	3	2	B	B	B	B	B	R	B	B	B
Würzburger FV 04 ^{1}	16				11	6	10	6	3	2	2	1	B	B	B	1	B	1	B	B	B	B	1	B	B
FC Schweinfurt 05	5	B	B	2B	B	B	B	B	B	B	B	R	R	R	2B	R	R	B	7	1	B	B	2	B	B
VfL Frohnlach	11	B	B	2	1	B	3	B	B	B	B	B	3	3	2	3	1	B	B	B	1	B	B	1	B
Kickers Würzburg	23	4	1	B	4	11	15	9	7	1	B	9	5	8	17				6	6	2	B	5	5	1
TSV Aubstadt	11									13	14	17		10	14	14	16					9	15	13	2
SpVgg Selbitz	7																		13	4	6	13	12	2	3
SpVgg Bayreuth	4	B	B	B	B	B	B	B	B	B	1	B	2	1	B	B	B	B	R	B	B	B	B	B	4
SV Memmelsdorf	16	2	9	4	9	15							10	14	7	12	9	15			8	1	B	10	5
1. FC Sand	28	10	14	15	6	4	4	7	6	4	3	5	1	B	B	9	3	3	3	3	10	2	6	3	6
TSV Kleinrinderfeld	1																								7
1. FC Trogen	2																						16		8
Alemannia Haibach	16							2	2	B	17		13	4	10	6	5	6	10	2	4	3	4	6	9
TG Höchberg	24		7	14	14	5	8	13	5	11	6	13	14	12	8	7	6	9	14	8	7	8	3	9	10
TSV Neudrossenfeld	3																						7	8	11
DJK Don Bosco Bamberg	2																							7	12
FT Schweinfurt	31	12	13	13	18				8	8	13	14	7	13	16		7	8	9	5	12	10	8	4	13
ASV Hollfeld	4																					15	13	11	14
1. FC Burgkunstadt	4																							14	15
FC Gerolzhofen	8											18													16
TuS Frammersbach	5																							12	17
SV Pettstadt	2																	19							18
FVgg Bayern Kitzingen	9															18		18						15	
ASV Rimpar	6																					7	14	16	
FC Viktoria Kahl	12												12	9	9	10	4	10	5	12	11	14	10	17	
DVV Coburg ^{7}	8															8	12	7	16		13	11	9	18	
Eintracht Bamberg II ^{8}	2																					12	11		
FC Blau-Weiß Leinach	1																						17		
SV Friesen	8													16			8	12	12	10	3	5	18		
SV Mitterteich	14		6	9	15	17								11	5	5	10	5	11	7	9	4	19		
TSV Mönchröden	5																		4	14	5	6	20		
FC Strullendorf	10						7	11	10	6	7	10	17							15	15	16			
1. FC Haßfurt	21	13		11	16	16				9	9	16			4	11	11	17			16	17			
TSV Sulzfeld	7													15	12	13	13	16			14	18			
TSV Thiersheim	9									12	11	11	15		11	15	17			9	17				
SpVgg Stegaurach	6							3	1	B	B	B	B	B	13	16				13	18				
SV Aschaffenburg-Damm ^{6}	1																			11					
TSV Lengenfeld	2																		15	16					
TSV Karlburg	4																			17					
SpVgg Bayreuth II ^{2}	5																	11	8	18					
1. FC Bamberg ^{8}	24					8	17				15	8	4	6	6	4	2	4	2						
TSV Aidhausen	3																14	14	17						
SV Erlenbach	11								17							17		13	18						
SpVgg Bayern Hof II	1																15								
SC Weismain	12	8	11	5	5	7	5	1	B	R	R	R	B	5	15		18								
TSV Gerbrunn ^{5}	4											6	6	7	1	B									
TSV Scheuerfeld	1															19									
Wacker Trailsdorf	1														18										
Teutonia Obernau	8						13	4	4	3	8	15	9	17											
DJK Waldberg	7						9	10	11	5	4	2	11	18											
ATS Kulmbach	19	15			17							7	16												
DJK Schweinfurt	14	7	2	7	10	10	14	15	13	7	10	12	18												
SC Weismain II	3										12	4	19												
FC Kronach	21	B	5	6	13	9	18		12	10	16														
1. FC Lichtenfels	16				19			8	9	14	18														
FC Adler Weidhausen	4							12	15	15	19														
VfB Helmbrechts ^{4}	16	1	B	B	8	1	B	B	B	B															
FC Rodach	4						11	5	14	16															
SV Frankenwinheim	1									17															
ASV Gaustadt	9									18															
SV Heidingsfeld	14	6	3	10	2	3	2	B	16																
SC 08 Bamberg	4			1	B	B	12	14	18																
VfB Coburg ^{7}	15	16				12	16	17																	
Wacker Marktredwitz	21	3	4	12	7	13	6	18																	
TV Helmstadt	4			16		14																			
SV Hallstadt	13	14	10	17																					
TSV Trebgast	13	11	12	18																					
SG Randersacker	2	9	15																						
FC Frankonia Thulba	1		16																						
TSV Hirschaid	7		17																						
FC Ochsenfurt	2	17																							

=== Key ===
Symbol	Key
B	Bundesliga
RL 2B	Regionalliga Süd (1963–74): 2. Bundesliga (1974–present)
3L	3. Liga
R	Regionalliga Süd (1994–present)
B	Bayernliga
1	League champions
Place	League
Blank	Played at a league level below this league
H	Played in the league system of Hesse

- S = No of seasons in league (as of 2011–12)

=== Notes ===
- ^{1} In 1981, FV Würzburg 04 folded and reformed as Würzburger FV.
- ^{2} In 1982, the SpVgg Bayreuth II withdrew from the league because the club's first team was relegated to the Bayernliga.
- ^{3} In 1992, the FC Bayern Alzenau withdrew from the league and joined the Landesliga Hessen-Süd instead. In 2009, the club earned promotion to the Regionalliga.
- ^{4} In 1997, the VfB Helmbrechts withdrew from the Bayernliga to the lower amateur leagues.
- ^{5} In 2003, the TSV Gerbrunn withdrew from the Bayernliga to the lower amateur leagues.
- ^{6} In 2007, the SV Aschaffenburg-Damm withdrew from the league.
- ^{7} In 2000, VfB Coburg merged with local side DJK/Viktoria Coburg to form DVV Coburg. In 2011, the new club became insolvent.
- ^{8} In 2006, the 1. FC Bamberg merged with TSV Eintracht Bamberg to form 1. FC Eintracht Bamberg. Prior to merger, results for the 1. FC are shown. The club became insolvent in 2010, folded, reformed as FC Eintracht Bamberg 2010 and continued playing in the Bayernliga. The reserve team however withdrew from the Landesliga.
- ^{9} In 2005, the FC Bayern Hof merged with SpVgg Hof to form SpVgg Bayern Hof. League placings for SpVgg Hof are shown separately while placings for FC and SpVgg Bayern Hof are combined.
- ^{10} In 2003, 1. FC Bayreuth and BSV 98 Bayreuth merged to form FSV Bayreuth. BSV 98 Bayreuth itself had been formed in a merger of VfB Bayreuth and TuSpo Bayreuth in 1968.
- ^{11} In 1974, the SC Kreuzwertheim disbanded its football department.
- ^{12} In 1972, the TSV Mainaschaff withdrew from the league.
- ^{13} In 1965, the SV Großwallstadt withdrew from the league.

== League records 1963–2012 ==
The league records in regards to points, wins, losses and goals for the clubs in the league are:

Record	Team	Season	Number
Most wins	VfB Helmbrechts	1988–89	29
Most wins	Würzburger FV	2002–03	29
Most wins	Würzburger FV	2004–05	29
Most wins	Würzburger FV	2009–10	29
Most wins	FC Schweinfurt 05	2009–10	29
Fewest wins	SC Weismain II	1999–2000	1
Most defeats	SC Weismain II	1999–2000	32
Fewest defeats	VfL Frohnlach	1979–80	1
Fewest defeats	VfL Frohnlach	2010–11	1
Most goals for	1. FC Sand	1999–2000	122
Fewest goals for	TSV Trebgast	1990–91	24
Most goals against	SC Weismain II	1999–2000	197
Fewest goals against	SC 08 Bamberg	1990–91	14
Highest points (2 for a win)	FC Schweinfurt 05	1983–84	61
Highest points (2 for a win)	SV Heidingsfeld	1984–85	61
Lowest points (2 for a win)	TSV Staffelstein	1969–70	7
Highest points (3 for a win)	Würzburger FV	2002–03	90
Highest points (3 for a win)	Würzburger FV	2004–05	90
Highest points (3 for a win)	Würzburger FV	2009–10	90
Lowest points (3 for a win)	SC Weismain II	1999–2000	6
