= Bayernliga =

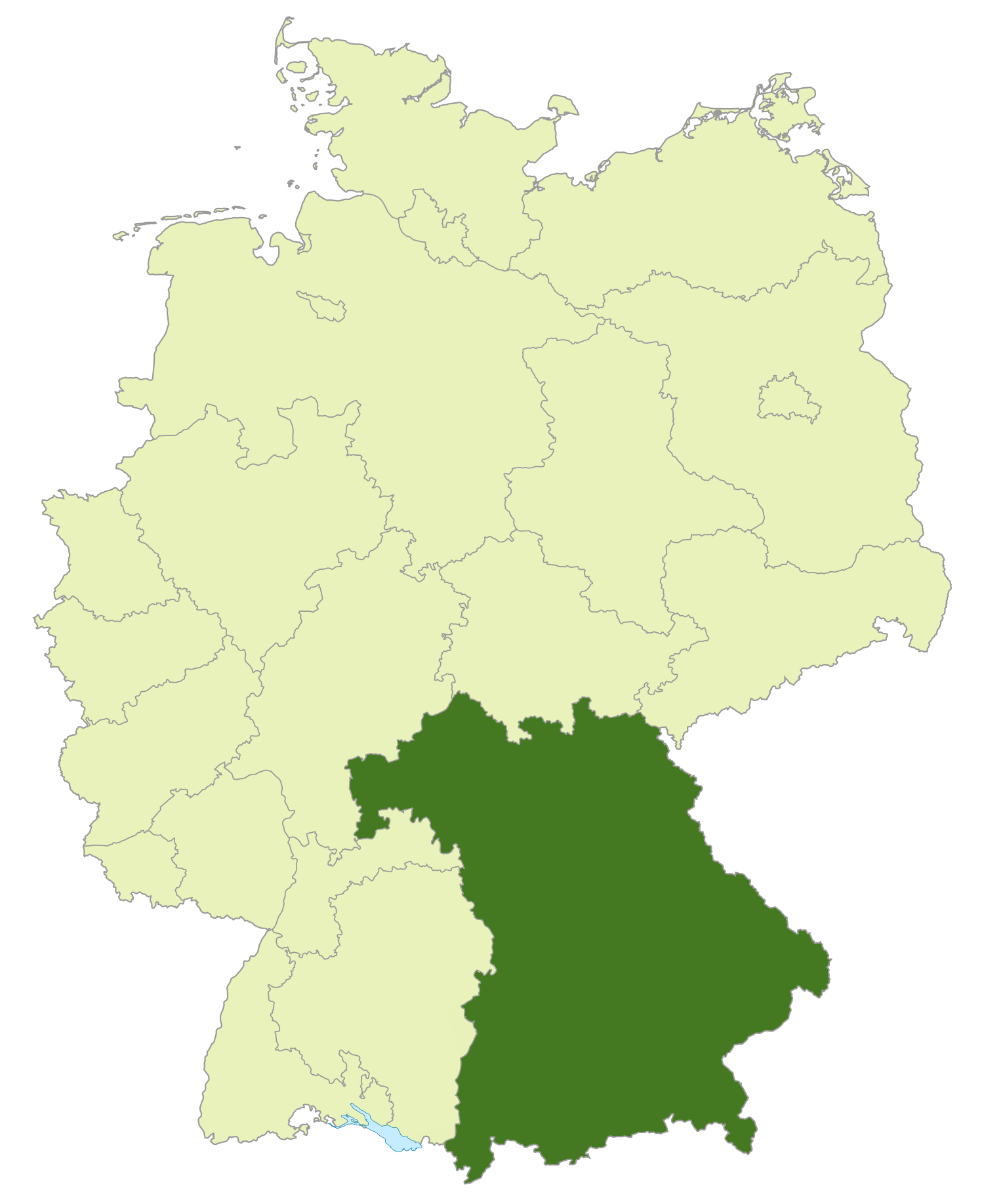
- Organising body: Bavarian Football Association
- Founded: 1945
- Country: Germany
- State: Bavaria
- Divisions: 2
- Number of clubs: 36 (18 teams of each division)
- Level on pyramid: Level 5
- Promotion to: Regionalliga Bayern
- Relegation to: Landesliga Nordost; Landesliga Nordwest; Landesliga Mitte; Landesliga Südost; Landesliga Südwest
- Domestic cup: Bavarian Cup
- Current champions: North: SC Eltersdorf; South: 1860 Munich II (2025–26)
- Current: 2026–27 Bayernliga

The Bayernliga (English: Bavarian league) is the highest amateur football league and the second highest football league (under the Regionalliga Bayern) in the state of Bavaria (German: Bayern) and the Bavarian football league system. It is one of fourteen Oberligas in German football, the fifth tier of the German football league system. Until the introduction of the 3. Liga in 2008 it was the fourth tier of the league system, until the introduction of the Regionalligas in 1994 the third tier.

From the 2012–13 season onwards, the league has been divided once more into a northern and a southern division, having previously placed in single division format since 1963. The league sits directly under the Regionalliga Bayern and above the Landesligas, which were expanded in number from three to five at the end of the 2011–12 season.

== Overview ==
=== Landesliga Bayern: 1945–1950 ===
The league was formed in 1945 from nine clubs as the Landesliga Bayern, being then the second tier of the German football league system, right below the Oberliga Süd in the re-formed state of Bavaria, then part of the US occupation zone in Germany. The league run then in parallel with the Landesligas of Hessen, Württemberg and Nordbaden.

The league expanded in its second season to two divisions of eleven teams each, the Staffel Nordbayern and Staffel Südbayern with the league champions playing each other for the Bavarian championship and promotion. The year after, the leagues went to thirteen teams each.

In 1948, the league was reunited in one group of sixteen teams with the top-two clubs gaining promotion. The 1949–50 season was run on fourteen clubs with the top-five clubs gaining promotion to the new 2. Oberliga Süd.

=== Amateurliga Bayern: 1950–1953 ===
The league was renamed Amateurliga Bayern, a name it would carry until 1978, and was now the third tier of the league system, below the 2nd Oberliga. It consisted of sixteen clubs in its first season, then went to eighteen and later nineteen.

=== Amateurliga Nordbayern and Südbayern: 1953–1963 ===
In 1953, the league split into a northern and a southern group again, each with fifteen clubs. The main reasons for this was to reduce travel-costs and time, but also to create two regional champions in Bavaria which both could take part in the promotion rounds to the 2nd Oberliga instead of only one. Being the largest of the southern German federations, Bavaria felt disadvantaged by the fact that only its champion was permitted to take part in the promotion rounds.

The number of teams in the two leagues kept fluctuating and sometimes clubs from central Bavaria were moved between divisions to balance out the strength.

In those years up to 1963, the leagues below the Bayernliga were the 2. Amateurligas, which there was supposed to be seven of, according to the number of Bezirke in Bavaria. However, some, like Oberbayern, split their 2nd Amateurliga in more than one division.

=== Amateurliga Bayern: 1963–1978 ===
In 1963, with the introduction of the Bundesliga, the Oberliga Süd and 2nd Oberliga Süd were disbanded. The Amateurliga Bayern was reunited and now came under the Regionalliga Süd, the new second tier of the league system in the south. The Amateurliga retained its status as a tier three league.

Seven clubs from the northern and southern division each plus four from the 2nd Oberliga made up the newly reunited league in 1963. The league champion still had to compete for promotion with the winners of the other southern German amateur leagues while the bottom three teams were relegated. Below the Bayernliga, three Landesligas were established and remain there to this date, with their champions directly promoted:

- Landesliga Bayern-Nord, covering Unterfranken and Oberfranken
- Landesliga Bayern-Mitte, covering Mittelfranken, Oberpfalz and Niederbayern
- Landesliga Bayern-Süd, covering Schwaben and Oberbayern

The league remained unchanged throughout the coming years, until 1974, when the Regionalliga was replaced by the 2. Bundesliga Süd. For the Bayernliga, this still meant little change, the winner still had to play-off for promotion to the new league.

=== Amateur-Oberliga Bayern: 1978–1994 ===
The year 1978 saw a reformation of the highest Amateurligas in Germany, their number was halved from sixteen to eight, making direct promotion for the southern champions possible for the first time. The Amateurligas were also renamed Amateur-Oberligas, which was generally shortened to AOL or, more commonly, just Oberliga. In the south, this meant the Bayernliga now run parallel to the Amateur-Oberligas of Hessen, Baden-Württemberg and Südwest.

Direct promotion for the southern champions only lasted two seasons however, 1978–79 and 1979–80. In 1981, the 2. Bundesliga was united to one single division, making it necessary for the Oberliga champions to have a promotion round again. In this season, the Bavarian FA (German: Bayrischer Fußball Verband) also introduced a promotion round for the Landesligas, meaning the three second placed teams in those leagues played the fourth-last Bayernliga team for one more spot in the league. In some seasons, additional promotion spots were available, for example when the Bayernliga champion managed to move up to the 2nd Bundesliga.

=== Oberliga Bayern: 1994–2012 ===
After having been a tier three league for 44 seasons, the re-introduction of the Regionalligas, now at this level, made the Bayernliga slip to tier four. It also adopted a new, shorter name, being simply called Oberliga Bayern now, because the highest (German: Oberste) amateur league was now the Regionalliga.

The six teams with the best overall record over the last three seasons in the Bayernliga, or above, gained entry to the new Regionalliga Süd, these being:

- FC Augsburg
- SV Lohhof
- SpVgg Unterhaching
- FC Bayern Munich II
- SpVgg Fürth
- TSV Vestenbergsgreuth

This fact also allowed a greater number of clubs then usually to move up from the Landesliga.

But above all, for the first time since 1980, the Bavarian champion was directly promoted again, now to the Regionalliga. The one exception for this was the year 2000, when the number of Regionalligas was reduced from four to two.

The year 2008 saw another league system change. The 3. Liga was introduced to slide between 2nd Bundesliga and Regionalligas. For the Bayernliga this meant a further fall, to tier five now. However, its best four teams of this season gained entry to the Regionalliga, providing their finances complied with the leagues regulations, those clubs being:

- SpVgg Greuther Fürth II
- 1. FC Nuremberg II
- TSV Großbardorf
- 1. FC Eintracht Bamberg
- SpVgg Unterhaching II

The Bayernliga champion, SpVgg Bayreuth, was refused a Regionalliga licence, Bamberg took its spot instead. Due to the Sportfreunde Siegen also being denied a licence, another Bavarian team was promoted to the Regionalliga, this being the reserve team of Unterhaching.

=== Bayernliga Nord and Süd: from 2012 ===
In October 2010, another reform of the Regionalligas was decided upon. The number of leagues were now to be expanded to five, with the defunct Regionalliga Nordost to be reestablished and a Regionalliga Bayern to be established. Also, the Regionalliga West would lose the clubs from the south west to a new league, formed out of those clubs and the clubs from Regionalliga Süd without the Bavarian teams. The new system came into operation in the 2012–13 season. It was also decided to limit the number of reserve teams per Regionalliga to seven.

The Bavarian football federation carried out drastic changes to the league system from 2012 onwards. With the already decided introduction of the Regionalliga Bayern from 2012 to 2013, it placed two Bayernligas below the new league as the new fifth tier of the German league system. Below those, five Landesligas instead of the existing three were set which are geographically divided to limit travel and increase the number of local derbies. This model was adopted in late April 2011. With the league reform at the end of the 2011–12 season, the Bezirksoberligas were also disbanded. Instead, the Bezirksligas took the place of the Bezirksoberligas once more below the Landesligas, a system already in place from 1963 to 1988.

While it was originally thought that the Regionalliga Bayern would carry the name Bayernliga, it was later revealed that the current Bayernliga would have that honour, making the Bayernliga a divided league as it had been from 1953 to 1963. The new qualification mode would see all current Bavarian Regionalliga teams qualify for the new league as well as the top nine of the Bayernliga. Additionally, the teams placed 10th to 15th entered a promotion round with, nominally the six Landesliga champions and runners-up for three more spots in the new league, but dependent on licensing for the new league. Fluctuations of this formula were however also possible if a Bavarian club was promoted to or relegated from the 3rd Liga.

The losers of the Regionalliga qualification round, nine clubs, and the Landesliga clubs placed third to eighth, 18 clubs, all entered the new Bayernligas, as did the winners of the Bayernliga promotion round between the Landesliga clubs placed eleventh to 15th and the Bezirksoberliga champions. The Landesliga clubs that failed to qualify for the Bayernligas remained in one of the five new Landesligas; there was no relegation to the Bezirksligas.

=== League timeline ===
The league went through the following timeline of name changes, format and position in the league system:

Years	Name		Tier	Promotion to
1945–46	Landesliga Bayern		II	Oberliga Süd
1946–48	Landesliga Südbayern	Landesliga Nordbayern	II	Oberliga Süd
1948–50	Landesliga Bayern		II	Oberliga Süd
1950–53	Amateurliga Bayern		III	2. Oberliga Süd
1953–63	Amateurliga Südbayern	Amateurliga Nordbayern	III	2nd Oberliga Süd
1963–74	Amateurliga Bayern		III	Regionalliga Süd
1974–78	Amateurliga Bayern		III	2. Bundesliga Süd
1978–81	Amateur-Oberliga Bayern		III	2nd Bundesliga Süd
1981–94	Amateur-Oberliga Bayern		III	2nd Bundesliga
1994–2008	Oberliga Bayern		IV	Regionalliga Süd
2008–12	Oberliga Bayern		V	Regionalliga Süd
2012–	Bayernliga Süd	Bayernliga Nord	V	Regionalliga Bayern

== Champions of the Bayernliga ==
=== 1945–1953 ===
In 1945–46, the Landesliga Bayern was played as a single division, in 1946–47 and 1947–48 it was played in two regional divisions with a home-and-away final to determine the Bavarian champion. From 1948 to 1953, it was played as a single division again:

Season	Club
1945–46	1. FC Bamberg

Season	North	South	Final
1946–47	FC Bayern Hof	**FC Wacker München**	3–4 & 0–4
1947–48	1. FC Bamberg	**BC Augsburg**	1–1 & 1–4

- Bavarian champions in this era in **bold**.

Season	Club
1948–49	Jahn Regensburg
1949–50	1. FC Bamberg
1950–51	VfL Neustadt
1951–52	FC Amberg
1952–53	ATS Kulmbach

=== 1953–1963 ===
From 1953 to 1963, the Bayernliga was divided into a northern and a southern group again. From 1956 onwards, a Bavarian final was held again:

Season	North	South	Final
1953–54	VfL Neustadt	SpVgg Weiden	N/A
1954–55	VfB Helmbrechts	FC Penzberg	N/A
1955–56	**VfB Bayreuth**	ESV Ingolstadt	2–1 & 0–3 & 1–0 aet
1956–57	**1. FC Bamberg**	FC Penzberg	3–0 & 0–2
1957–58	**1. FC Bamberg**	FC Wacker München	4–0 & 2–3
1958–59	**SpVgg Bayreuth**	TSV Schwaben Augsburg	2–0 & 0–0
1959–60	FC Lichtenfels	**TSV Schwaben Augsburg**	3–5
1960–61	**1. FC Haßfurt**	TSV 1860 München II	not held
1961–62	SpVgg Büchenbach	**ESV Ingolstadt**	1–1 & 0–1
1962–63	1. FC Bamberg	**TSV Straubing**	4–3 & 3–6 & 1–5

- Bavarian champions in this era in **bold**

=== 1963–2012 ===
From 1963 onwards, the Bayernliga was always held as a single division. From 1963 to 1980 and from 1995 onwards, the league champion had the right to direct promotion. In 1974 and 1981, no promotion was available and from 1982 to 1994, the league champion had to participate in the promotion round. When the league champion declined, as has happened twice, the runners-up was promoted/qualified for the promotion round:

Season	Club
1963–64	**FC Wacker München**
1964–65	**SpVgg Weiden**
1965–66	**BC Augsburg**
1966–67	**SSV Jahn Regensburg**
1967–68	**ESV Ingolstadt**
1968–69	**SpVgg Bayreuth**
1969–70	**FC Wacker München**
1970–71	**SpVgg Bayreuth**
1971–72	**FC Wacker München**
1972–73	**FC Augsburg**
1973–74	ASV Herzogenaurach
1974–75	**SSV Jahn Regensburg**
1975–76	FC Wacker München ^{1}
1976–77	**Kickers Würzburg**
1977–78	1. FC Haßfurt ^{2}
1978–79	**ESV Ingolstadt**
1979–80	**FC Augsburg**

Season	Club
1980–81	MTV Ingolstadt
1981–82	**FC Augsburg**
1982–83	SpVgg Unterhaching
1983–84	TSV 1860 München
1984–85	**SpVgg Bayreuth**
1985–86	SpVgg Landshut
1986–87	**SpVgg Bayreuth**
1987–88	SpVgg Unterhaching
1988–89	**SpVgg Unterhaching**
1989–90	**FC Schweinfurt 05**
1990–91	**TSV 1860 München**
1991–92	**SpVgg Unterhaching**
1992–93	**TSV 1860 München**
1993–94	FC Augsburg
1994–95	**Wacker Burghausen**
1995–96	**SC Weismain**

Season	Club
1996–97	**TSV 1860 München II**
1997–98	**FC Schweinfurt 05**
1998–99	**SV Lohhof**
1999–2000	**SSV Jahn Regensburg**
2000–01	**SpVgg Ansbach**
2001–02	**FC Augsburg**
2002–03	**1. SC Feucht**
2003–04	**TSV 1860 München II**
2004–05	**SpVgg Bayreuth**
2005–06	**FC Ingolstadt 04**
2006–07	**SSV Jahn Regensburg**
2007–08	SpVgg Bayreuth ^{3}
2008–09	**SpVgg Weiden**
2009–10	**FC Memmingen**
2010–11	FC Ismaning ^{4}
2011–12	**TSV 1860 Rosenheim**

=== 2012–present ===
Since 2012 the Bayernliga has once more been divided into a northern and a southern group:

Season	North	South
2012–13	**FC Schweinfurt 05**	**SV Schalding-Heining**
2013–14	**SpVgg Bayreuth**	BC Aichach ^{5}
2014–15	**Viktoria Aschaffenburg**	**TSV Rain am Lech**
2015–16	**SV Seligenporten**	**VfR Garching**
2016–17	**VfB Eichstätt**	SV Pullach^{6}
2017–18	**Viktoria Aschaffenburg**	**SV Heimstetten**
2018–19	**TSV Aubstadt**	**Türkgücü München**
2019–20^{7}	No champions, season suspended and later extended to 2021	
2020–21^{7}	**SC Eltersdorf**	**FC Pipinsried**
2021–22	**DJK Vilzing**	**SpVgg Hankofen-Hailing**
2022–23	**FC Eintracht Bamberg**	**SV Schalding-Heining**
2023–24	**SpVgg Hankofen-Hailing**	SV Erlbach
2024–25	**VfB Eichstätt**	**FC Memmingen**
2025–26	**SC Eltersdorf**	1860 Munich II^{8}

Source: "Oberliga Bayern". Das deutsche Fußball-Archiv.

- Promoted teams in **bold**.
- ^{1} FC Wacker München declined promotion, Würzburger FV promoted as runners-up.
- ^{2} 1. FC Haßfurt declined promotion, MTV Ingolstadt promoted as runners-up.
- ^{3} SpVgg Bayreuth was refused a Regionalliga licence.
- ^{4} FC Ismaning declined promotion, runners-up FC Ingolstadt II promoted instead.
- ^{5} BC Aichach declined promotion and withdrew from the Bayernliga, VfR Garching promoted instead.
- ^{6} SV Pullach declined promotion, runners-up FC Unterföhring promoted instead.
- ^{7} The 2019–20 season was interrupted by the coronavirus disease 2019 (COVID-19) pandemic in Germany that was declared in March 2020. It was later suspended until 31 August, forcing a cancellation of the 2020–21 season as the BFV approved a resumption of the preceding one, which was curtailed in May 2021.
- ^{8} Reserve teams are ineligible for promotion, runners-up TSV Landsberg promoted instead.

== Recent top scorers ==
The top scorers in the league since 2005:

=== Bayernliga until 2012 ===
Year	Player	Club	Goals
2005–06	Petr Stoilov	1. FC Bad Kötzting	17
2006–07	Peter Heyer	1. FC Eintracht Bamberg	27
2007–08	Peter Heyer ^{1}	1. FC Eintracht Bamberg	18
2007–08	Sebastian Knüttel	TSV Großbardorf	18
2007–08	Mijo Stijepic	TSG Thannhausen	18
2008–09	Thomas Karg	VfL Frohnlach	24
2009–10	Christian Doll	TSV Aindling	21
2010–11	Benjamin Neunteufel	SV Schalding-Heining	25
2011–12	Cem Ekinci	SpVgg Bayern Hof	22

=== Bayernliga North ===
Year	Player	Club	Goals
2012–13	Tom Jäckel	SpVgg Jahn Forchheim	25
2013–14	Christoph Hegenbart; Alexander Mantlik	SpVgg SV Weiden; TSV Großbardorf	18
2014–15	Florian Pieper	Viktoria Aschaffenburg	25
2015–16	Christian Breunig	Alemannia Haibach	29
2016–17	Fabian Eberle	VfB Eichstätt	28
2017–18	Björn Schnitzer	Viktoria Aschaffenburg	33
2018–19	Martin Thomann	TSV Aubstadt	24
2019–21	Simon Snaschel	TSV Großbardorf	20
2021–22	Patrick Kroiß	SpVgg Ansbach	29
2022–23	Lukas Däbritz	SV Donaustauf	25
2023–24	Lucas Schraufstetter	VfB Eichstätt	21
2024–25	Fabian Ziegler	Fortuna Regensburg	23
2025–26	Kelvin Onuigwe	Jahn Regensburg II	19

=== Bayernliga South ===
Year	Player	Club	Goals
2012–13	Sebastian Kinzel	BC Aichach	25
2013–14	Florian Schrepel	TSV Bogen	22
2014–15	Sebastian Kinzel	TSV Rain am Lech	51
2015–16	Orhan Akkurt	SV Heimstetten	26
2016–17	Orhan Akkurt	SV Heimstetten	31
2017–18	Sebastiano Nappo	SV Heimstetten	28
2018–19	Lukas Däbritz	SV Pullach	20
2019–21	Pablo Pigl	FC Pipinsried	20
2019–21	Steffen Krautschneider	FC Pipinsried	20
2021–22	Tobias Lermer	SpVgg Hankofen-Hailing	20
2021–22	Tobias Lermer	SpVgg Hankofen-Hailing	22
2022–23	Julian Kania	TSV Schwaben Augsburg	26
2023–24	Nico Karger	TSV Landsberg	22
2024–25	Jordi Woudstra	SV Heimstetten	22
2025–26	Simon Gruber	TSV Nördlingen	27

Source: 50 Jahre Bayerischer Fußball-Verband. Vindelica Verlag. 1996. p. 211.

- ^{1} Peter Heyer scored 19 goals in the 2007–08 season but since Bamberg's 1–0 win against Memmingen, where he scored, was later changed to a 0–x loss due to Bamberg using two non-eligible players, only 18 of his goals were officially recognised.

== League placings since 2012 ==
The complete list of clubs and placings in the Bayernliga since the league was sub-divided into two divisions:

=== Bayernliga Nord 2012–present ===
The complete list of clubs and placings in the Bayernliga Nord since the league was sub-divided into two divisions:

Club	13	14	15	16	17	18	19	20	21	22	23	24	25
SpVgg Bayreuth	6	1	R	R	R	R	R	R	R	R	3L	R	R
1. FC Schweinfurt 05	1	R	R	R	R	R	R	R	R	R	R	R	R
Viktoria Aschaffenburg	R	R	1	R	2	1	R	R	R	R	R	R	R
TSV Aubstadt	8	2	9	8	3	2	1	R	R	R	R	R	R
DJK Vilzing			5	12	6	7	5	1	2	1	R	R	R
SpVgg Ansbach			15		13	7	11	10	6	2	R	R	R
FC Eintracht Bamberg	R	R	R	18				6	8	4	1	R	R
SpVgg Hankofen-Hailing	10	7	6	9	13	13	13	14	14	1	R	1	R
VfB Eichstätt	9	4	13	2	1	R	R	R	R	R	R	2	1
SC Eltersdorf	R	8	7	7	6	4	6	2	1	R	3	3	2
FC Ingolstadt 04 II	R	R	R	R	R	R	R	4	4	3	4	5	3
ATSV Erlangen							13	7	10	3	12	11	4
ASV Cham								9	11	13	7	7	5
Fortuna Regensburg												15	6
SpVgg SV Weiden		5	4	5	14	14					17		7
TSV Kornburg						19					9	14	8
TSV Neudrossenfeld			17									9	9
Würzburger FV	5	10	11	12	12	3	3	8	7	14	10	17	10
SpVgg Bayern Hof	R	R	8	3	R	10	7	12	13	12	15	6	11
ASV Neumarkt	12	17			5	8	18			5	11	13	12
SSV Jahn Regensburg II	5	7	6	13	16		3	15	12	4	8	12	13
TSV Abtswind							10	14	12	9	4	4	14
DJK Ammerthal	7	12	14		8	12	12	5	5	8	6	8	15
DJK Gebenbach						5	2	11	9	7	2	10	16
Eintracht Münchberg													17
TSV Karlburg								16	16	16			18
FC Coburg												16	
SV Donaustauf								11	11	2	5	18	
1. SC Feucht				10	15					10	13	19	
DJK Don Bosco Bamberg	16			11	11	13	8	13	14	6	14		
TSV Großbardorf	3	6	5	4	4	8	4	4	4	11	16		
1. FC Geesdorf											18		
Vatan Spor Aschaffenburg										15			
SV Seligenporten	R	R	R	1	R	R	5	3	3	17			
1. FC Sand	17			9	7	15	14	15	15	18			
FC Viktoria Kahl								17	17				
Würzburger Kickers II					9	11	9						
ASV Vach							15						
FSV Erlangen-Bruck	13	14	16			9	16						
SpVgg Jahn Forchheim	2	3	3	16		6	17						
1. FC Schweinfurt 05 II						16							
SV Erlenbach		9	10	14	16	17							
FC Amberg	4	4	2	R	10	18							
Alemannia Haibach	10	16	12	6	17								
VfL Frohnlach	R	11	13	17	18								
ASV Burglengenfeld				15									
SV Memmelsdorf	9	13	18										
SpVgg Selbitz	11	15											
ASV Hollfeld	14	18											
1. FC Trogen	15												
TSV Kleinrinderfeld	18												

=== Bayernliga Süd 2012–present ===
The complete list of clubs and placings in the Bayernliga Süd since the league was sub-divided into two divisions:

Club	13	14	15	16	17	18	19	20	21	22	23	24	25
Türkgücü München							1	R	3L	3L	R	R	R
DJK Vilzing			5	12	6	7	5	1	2	1	R	R	R
SpVgg Hankofen-Hailing	10	7	6	9	13	13	13	14	14	1	R	1	R
TSV Schwaben Augsburg						5	12	17	17	8	7	3	R
FC Memmingen	R	R	R	R	R	R	R	R	R	R	2	R	1
TSV 1860 Munich II	R	R	R	R	R	14	10	7	7	7	8	7	2
SV Erlbach				17							13	1	3
FC Pipinsried		3	3	10	3	R	R	1	1	R	R	8	4
FC Deisenhofen								3	2	10	12	5	5
TSV Kottern	18			11	12	4	7	6	5	12	5	9	6
SV Kirchanschöring				7	8	16	11	8	9	5	6	12	7
TSV Landsberg			8	15	15	18		13	15	9	3	4	8
SV Schalding-Heining	1	R	R	R	R	R	R	R	R	R	1	R	9
SV Heimstetten	R	R	R	6	7	1	R	R	R	R	R	2	10
TSV 1861 Nördlingen							9	18	18		11	6	11
Türkspor Augsburg								12	8	14	16	16	12
FC Ismaning	R	18			11	11	15	9	10	6	10	13	13
TSV Grünwald													14
1. FC Sonthofen	8	12	11	4	9	9	14					10	15
SpVgg Unterhaching II	6	9	19										16
TSV Rain am Lech	R	R	1	R	10	3	2	R	R	R	R	11	17
VfB Eichstätt	9	4	13	2	1	R	R	R	R	R	R	2	1
FC Ingolstadt 04 II	R	R	R	R	R	R	R	4	4	3	4	5	3
TSV Kornburg						19					9	14	8
ASV Neumarkt	12	17			5	8	18			5	11	13	12
SSV Jahn Regensburg II	5	7	6	13	16		3	15	12	4	8	12	13
TSV Dachau			12	8	5	10	6	10	13	17	14	14	
FC Gundelfingen					18					13	9	15	
VfR Garching		2	R	1	R	R	R	R	R	11	15	17	
Kirchheimer SC												18	
SV Donaustauf								11	11	2	5	18	
TSV 1860 Rosenheim	R	R	10	3	R	R	R	R	R	R	17		
VfB Hallbergmoos										15	18		
SV Pullach		5	2	2	1	2	4	16	16	16			
TSV 1880 Wasserburg								2	3	18			
TSV Schwabmünchen	14	8	14	14	4	6	8	5	6	19			
FC Unterföhring	7	10	9	5	2	R	16						
TuS Holzkirchen						12	17						
SB Chiemgau Traunstein						15							
BCF Wolfratshausen	13	16	7	13	14	17							
TSV Bogen		6	4	16	17								
SpVgg Ruhmannsfelden				18									
1. FC Bad Kötzting			15										
SpVgg Landshut	4	14	16										
SV Raisting		11	17										
SB/DJK Rosenheim	12	13	18										
BC Aichach	3	1											
SV Wacker Burghausen II	2	15											
FC Affing	11	17											
TSV Aindling	15												
SpVgg GW Deggendorf	16												
TSV Gersthofen	17												
SC Fürstenfeldbruck	19												

- Placings for 2020 were based on the tables at the point of suspension during the coronavirus pandemic. Final placings were determined on a points per game basis at the curtailment of the resumed 2019–20 season in 2021.

=== Key ===
Symbol	Key
OL B	Oberliga Süd (1945–63) Bundesliga (1963–present)
2O RL 2B	2nd Oberliga Süd (1950–63) Regionalliga Süd (1963–74): 2. Bundesliga (1974–present)
3L	3. Liga (2008–present)
R	Regionalliga Süd (1994–2012) Regionalliga Bayern (2012–present)
1	League champions
Place	League
Place	Played in opposite division
Blank	Played at a league level below this league

== League records 1963–2012 ==
The league records in regards to points, wins, losses and goals for the clubs in the league are:

Record	Team	Season	Number
Most wins	SpVgg Unterhaching	1982–83	31
Fewest wins	SpVgg Kaufbeuren	1969–70	2
Fewest wins	Kickers Würzburg	1990–91	2
Fewest wins	SpVgg Plattling	1991–92	2
Fewest wins	FC Passau	1999–2000	2
Most defeats	FC Starnberg	2000–01	28
Fewest defeats	TSV 1860 München	1990–91	0
Most goals for	SC Feucht	2002–03	107
Fewest goals for	SC Fürstenfeldbruck	1987–88	20
Most goals against	SpVgg Plattling	1966–67	123
Fewest goals against	TSV 1860 München	1990–91	21
Highest points (2 for a win)	SpVgg Unterhaching	1982–83	65
Lowest points (2 for a win)	SC Fürstenfeldbruck	1987–88	8
Highest points (3 for a win)	FC Augsburg	2001–02	89
Lowest points (3 for a win)	FC Passau	1999–2000	15

Source: "Tables and results of the Bayernliga". Herzing Manfred. Archived from the original on 9 February 2012.
