= Robert Glatzel =

German footballer

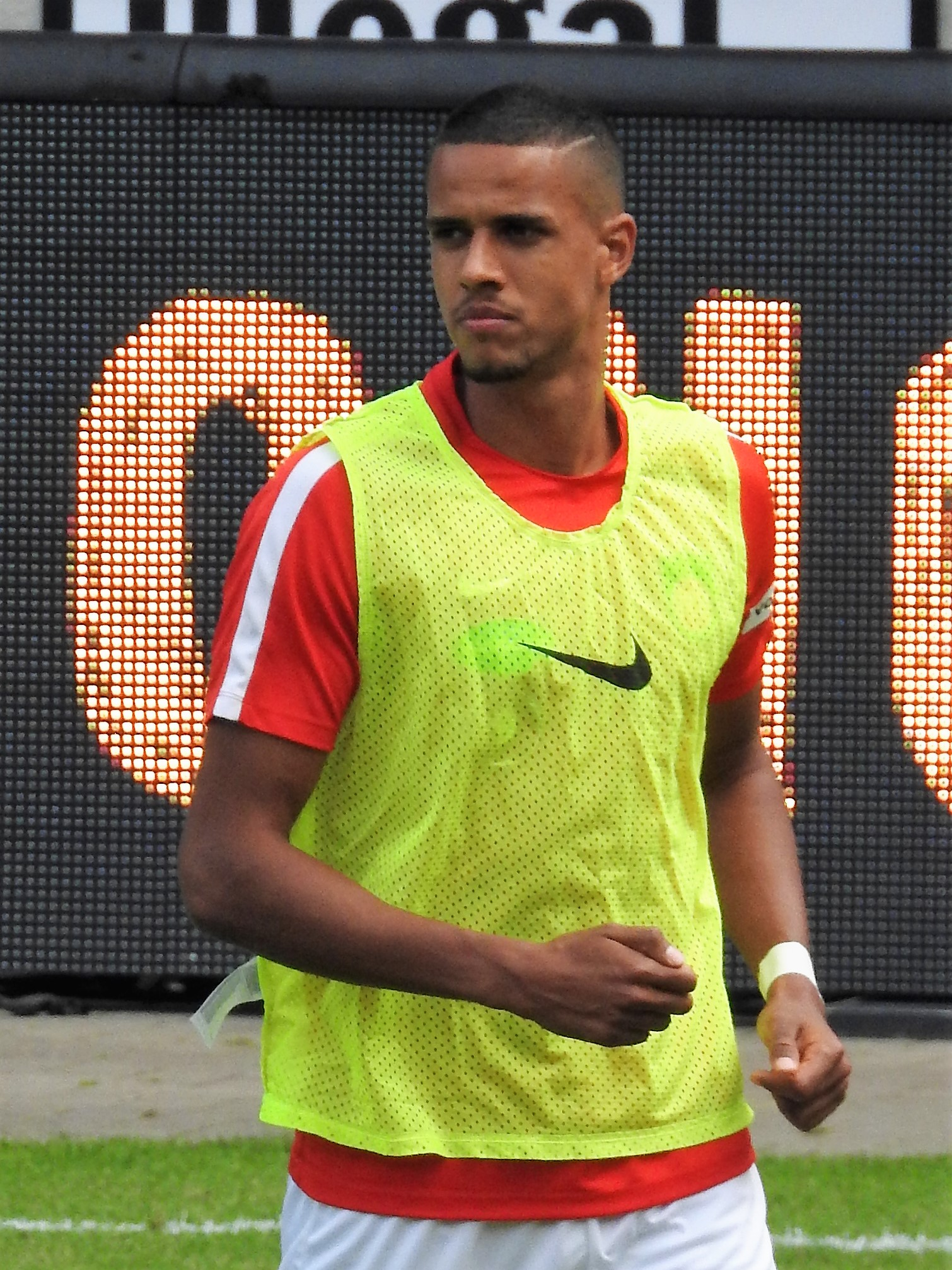
- Glatzel with 1. FC Heidenheim in 2017

Personal information
- Full name: Robert Nesta Glatzel
- Date of birth: 8 January 1994 (age 32)
- Place of birth: Fürstenfeldbruck, Germany
- Height: 1.93 m (6 ft 4 in)
- Position: Striker

Team information
- Current team: VfL Wolfsburg
- Number: 19

Youth career
- –2011: SC Fürstenfeldbruck
- 2011–2012: SpVgg Unterhaching
- 2012–2013: 1860 Munich

Senior career*
Years	Team	Apps	(Gls)
2011–2012	SpVgg Unterhaching II	10	(0)
2012–2013	1860 Munich II	8	(3)
2013	SV Heimstetten	4	(1)
2013–2014	Wacker Burghausen II	11	(3)
2013–2014	Wacker Burghausen	4	(0)
2014–2015	1860 Munich II	30	(5)
2015–2017	1. FC Kaiserslautern II	47	(27)
2015–2017	1. FC Kaiserslautern	19	(4)
2017–2019	1. FC Heidenheim	55	(17)
2019–2021	Cardiff City	51	(10)
2021	→ Mainz 05 (loan)	13	(2)
2021–2026	Hamburger SV	134	(76)
2026–	VfL Wolfsburg	5	(2)
- * Club domestic league appearances and goals as of 18 September 2026

Robert Nesta Glatzel (born 8 January 1994) is a German professional footballer who plays as a forward for 2. Bundesliga club VfL Wolfsburg.

== Early life ==
Glatzel was born in Bavaria to an Eritrean father and a German mother.

== Career ==
Born in Bavaria, Glatzel joined SC Fürstenfeldbruck, before he switched to SpVgg Unterhaching. In 2012, Glatzel joined the youth academy of 1860 Munich. After one year in the Munich-quarter of Giesing, he joined fourth-tier side SV Heimstetten and in September 2013, he switched to Wacker Burghausen in the professional 3. Liga. After struggling to maintain a regular place in Burghausen, Glatzel returned to 1860 Munich and played for the reserve team. In 2015, he left Bavaria and joined the 2. Bundesliga side 1. FC Kaiserslautern. Glatzel played for the reserve team and for the first team; for the latter, he made 19 appearances in the second division, scoring four goals.

In 2017, Glatzel joined 1. FC Heidenheim. On 3 April 2019, Glatzel played in a 5–4 defeat in the quarter-final match of the 2018-19 DFB-Pokal against top-flight Bayern Munich and scored three goals.

=== Cardiff City ===
On 31 July 2019, Glatzel signed for Championship side Cardiff City. He made his debut for the club in a 2–1 victory over Luton Town on 10 August. He scored his first goal for Cardiff on 13 September 2019 in a 1–1 draw away at Derby County.

==== Loan to Mainz 05 ====
On 1 February 2021, Glatzel joined German club Mainz 05 on a loan deal until the end of the season.

=== Hamburger SV ===
On 1 July 2021, Glatzel then joined German club Hamburger SV on a €1,000,000 fee. He then scored a goal in his debut match to help the club win over FC Schalke 04 in a 3–1 victory on 23 July 2021.

=== Wolfsburg ===
On 23 June 2026, Glatzel moved to VfL Wolfsburg in 2. Bundesliga.

== Career statistics ==
As of match played 18 September 2026

Appearances and goals by club, season and competition
Club	Season	League			National cup (Note: Includes DFB-Pokal, FA Cup)		League cup (Note: Includes EFL Cup)		Other		Total	
Club	Season	Division	Apps	Goals	Apps	Goals	Apps	Goals	Apps	Goals	Apps	Goals
SpVgg Unterhaching II	2011–12	Bayernliga	10	0	—		—		—		10	0
1860 Munich II	2012–13	Regionalliga Bayern	8	3	—		—		—		8	3
SV Heimstetten	2013–14	Regionalliga Bayern	4	1	0	0	—		—		4	1
Wacker Burghausen II	2013–14	Bayernliga Süd	11	3	—		—		—		11	3
Wacker Burghausen	2013–14	3. Liga	4	0	0	0	—		—		4	0
1860 Munich II	2014–15	Regionalliga Bayern	30	5	—		—		—		30	5
1. FC Kaiserslautern II	2015–16	Regionalliga Südwest	31	15	—		—		—		31	15
1. FC Kaiserslautern II	2016–17	Regionalliga Südwest	16	12	—		—		—		16	12
1. FC Kaiserslautern II	Total		47	27	—		—		—		47	27
1. FC Kaiserslautern	2016–17	2. Bundesliga	19	4	0	0	—		—		19	4
1. FC Heidenheim	2017–18	2. Bundesliga	29	4	3	3	—		—		32	7
1. FC Heidenheim	2018–19	2. Bundesliga	26	13	3	4	—		—		29	17
1. FC Heidenheim	Total		55	17	6	7	—		—		61	24
Cardiff City	2019–20	Championship	30	7	3	1	0	0	2 (Note: Appearances in Championship play-offs)	0	35	8
Cardiff City	2020–21	Championship	21	3	1	0	1	0	—		23	3
Cardiff City	Total		51	10	4	1	1	0	2	0	58	11
Mainz 05 (loan)	2020–21	Bundesliga	13	2	0	0	—		0	0	13	2
Hamburger SV	2021–22	2. Bundesliga	34	22	5	5	—		2 (Note: Appearances in Bundesliga promotion play-offs)	0	41	27
Hamburger SV	2022–23	2. Bundesliga	34	19	1	0	—		2	0	37	19
Hamburger SV	2023–24	2. Bundesliga	32	22	3	1	—		0	0	35	23
Hamburger SV	2024–25	2. Bundesliga	15	10	1	1	—		—		16	11
Hamburger SV	2025–26	Bundesliga	19	3	2	1	—		—		21	4
Hamburger SV	Total		134	76	12	8	—		4	0	150	84
VfL Wolfsburg	2026–27	2. Bundesliga	5	2	0	0	—		—		5	2
Career total			372	146	22	16	1	0	6	0	401	152
