= Karl-Heinz Lappe =

German footballer (born 1987)

Personal information
- Date of birth: 14 September 1987 (age 39)
- Place of birth: Munich, West Germany
- Height: 1.75 m (5 ft 9 in)
- Position: Forward

Youth career
- 1993–1996: SV Nord Lerchenau
- 1996–2001: Bayern Munich
- 2001: Unterhaching
- 2002–2006: Starnberg 09

Senior career*
Years	Team	Apps	(Gls)
2006–2008	Starnberg 09		
2008–2009	Unterföhring		
2009–2013	Ingolstadt 04 II	137	(81)
2011–2015	Ingolstadt 04	44	(5)
2015–2017	Bayern Munich II	59	(27)
2017–2019	Mainz 05 II	66	(34)
2019–2020	Türkgücü München	9	(1)
2020–2021	TSV Buchbach	5	(1)
- * Club domestic league appearances and goals

Karl-Heinz Lappe (born 14 September 1987) is a German former footballer who played as a forward.

== Career ==
Lappe played in Bayern Munich youth system, but was released at a young age and went on to forge a career in amateur football in Bavaria. In January 2009 he signed for FC Ingolstadt 04 to play for the reserve team in the Bayernliga, and scored on his debut, the fourth in a 5–1 win over FC Memmingen after he'd come on as a substitute for Ivan Santini. He ended the 2008–09 season with eight goals in thirteen appearances for Ingolstadt II, finishing as the team's joint top scorer with Stefan Müller.

Lappe was the team's top scorer both the 2009–10 season (17 goals) and the 2010–11 season (13 goals), as they finished in second place behind FC Ismaning – enough to earn promotion to the Regionalliga Süd, as Ismaning denied the opportunity to go up. Ingolstadt II finished in seventh place in the 2011–12 season, with Lappe scoring 18 goals - more than anyone else in the division. This earned him a call-up to the first-team - he made four appearances in the 2. Bundesliga, his debut as a substitute for Ahmed Akaïchi in a 2–0 defeat against 1860 Munich in November 2011.

Lappe was not involved in the Ingolstadt first team at the beginning of the 2012–13 season, but scored prolifically for the reserves, now in the Regionalliga Bayern, following a restructuring of the league. 21 goals before the winter-break saw him brought back in the first-team fold, and he made an immediate impact, scoring the opening goal in a 2–0 win over FSV Frankfurt, his first 2. Bundesliga goal.
