= SB/DJK Rosenheim =

German football club

- Full name: Sportbund Deutsche Jugend Kraft Rosenheim e.V.
- Founded: 1920
- Ground: Josef-März-Stadion
- Chairman: Willi Bonke
- Manager: Werner Wirkner
- League: Landesliga Bayern-Südost (VI)
- 2015–16: 6th
Home colours	Away colours

The SB/DJK Rosenheim is a German association football club from the city of Rosenheim, Bavaria. Apart from football, the club also offers other sports like tennis, basketball and American football, the latter in the form of the Rosenheim Rebels.

The club is best known for its former ice hockey department, which it took over in 1978 after the insolvency of local ice hockey Bundesliga side EV Rosenheim, and which won three German championships, in 1982, 1985 and 1989. The team, now playing as the Starbulls Rosenheim, has since left the club to become an independent organisation.

As a football club, Sportbund has had far less success, with a single season in the tier-three Fußball-Bayernliga in 1978–79 its greatest achievement. For the 2011–12 season, the club returns at this level for a second time, with the Bayernliga now being a tier-five league.

== History ==
The club was formed after the First World War, in 1920, under the name of DJK Rosenheim, DJK or Deutsche Jugend Kraft being a sports organisation of the Catholic Church in Germany. DJK did not have a football department at the time and was at first reluctant to adopt the sport but eventually, in 1932, a motion to form a department was passed.

DJK was not an outstanding side throughout its history and the club disappeared altogether during the Second World War era, to be reformed in 1947 as SB Rosenheim. The new team took up play in the lower amateur leagues of the region, at times struggling to attract players. In 1955, the club reconnected with its religious past and rejoined the DJK association, adopting its current name SB/DJK Rosenheim. The club's stadium and club house were purchased by the Catholic Church the following year.

The football department remained throughout its history in the shadow of local rival TSV 1860 Rosenheim, which achieved some occasional stints in the tier-three Fußball-Bayernliga while SB/DJK called the lowest amateur leagues, like the C- and B-Klasse, their home. It was not until 1970 that the club achieved promotion to respectable levels when it moved up into the tier-five Bezirksliga, at a time when TSV 1860 was relegated to this league from the Landesliga Bayern-Süd. While TSV returned to the Landesliga after two seasons, SB had to wait for promotion to this level until 1977.

The club was an instant success in the Landesliga, taking out the championship in its first season and earning promotion to the Bayernliga, where TSV already played. The games against the local rival attracted a good crowd with 1,100 and 2,500 in the two games. SB's time in the third division was however short lived, suffering instant relegation.

Back in the Landesliga, the team came second, behind champions SC Fürstenfeldbruck, the team it had finished just ahead of in the league two seasons earlier. Unfortunately for the club, 1979–80 was the last season where the Landesliga runners-up were not entitled to play a promotion round for another spot in the Bayernliga and SB remained in the league. After that, SB/DJK quickly declined and, by 1983, left the Landesliga again, coming second-last. A long absence from the Bavarian top leagues was to follow.

SB played in the Bezirksliga in the following years, qualifying for the new Bezirksoberliga Oberbayern in 1988. The club fluctuated between this league and the Bezirksliga for the next 15 seasons, only able to improve its results from 2004 onwards. The team finished runners-up in the league in 2007 and made a return to the Landesliga after a 24-year absence. The side achieved good results in the Landesliga in the following years and, in 2010–11, took out the league championship for a second time, making another return to the Bayernliga. At the end of the 2011–12 season the club managed to qualify for the promotion round to the new Regionalliga Bayern but was knocked out by FC Augsburg II in the first round. The club however retained its place in the Bayernliga, entering the southern division of the newly divided league from 2012. The club finished on a relegation rank in the 2014–15 season and dropped back to the Landesliga.

== Honours ==
The club's honours:

=== League ===
- Landesliga Bayern-Süd
  - Champions: (2) 1978, 2011
  - Runners-up: 1980
- Bezirksoberliga Oberbayern
  - Runners-up: 2007
- Bezirksliga Oberbayern-Ost
  - Champions: 1977
  - Runners-up: (2) 1993, 2002

== Recent managers ==
Recent managers of the club:

Manager	Start	Finish
Walter Werner		4 June 2012
Manfred Burghartswieser	22 June 2012	21 June 2013
Günter Güttler	21 June 2013	5 November 2014
Matthias Pongratz	5 November 2014	2016
Werner Wirkner	2016	Present

== Recent seasons ==
The recent season-by-season performance of the club:

Season	Division	Tier	Position
1999–2000	Bezirksliga Oberbayern-Ost	VII	7th
2000–01	Bezirksliga Oberbayern-Ost	VII	7th
2001–02	Bezirksliga Oberbayern-Ost	VII	2nd ↑
2002–03	Bezirksoberliga Oberbayern	VI	11th
2003–04	Bezirksoberliga Oberbayern	VI	6th
2004–05	Bezirksoberliga Oberbayern	VI	13th
2005–06	Bezirksoberliga Oberbayern	VI	6th
2006–07	Bezirksoberliga Oberbayern	VI	2nd ↑
2007–08	Landesliga Bayern-Süd	V	9th
2008–09	Landesliga Bayern-Süd	VI	4th
2009–10	Landesliga Bayern-Süd	VI	5th
2010–11	Landesliga Bayern-Süd	VI	1st ↑
2011–12	Bayernliga	V	14th
2012–13	Bayernliga Süd	V	12th
2013–14	Bayernliga Süd	V	13th
2014–15	Bayernliga Süd	V	18th ↓
2015–16	Landesliga Bayern-Südost	VI	6th
2016–17	Landesliga Bayern-Südost	VI	

- With the introduction of the Bezirksoberligas in 1988 as the new fifth tier, below the Landesligas, all leagues below dropped one tier. With the introduction of the Regionalligas in 1994 and the 3. Liga in 2008 as the new third tier, below the 2. Bundesliga, all leagues below dropped one tier. With the establishment of the Regionalliga Bayern as the new fourth tier in Bavaria in 2012 the Bayernliga was split into a northern and a southern division, the number of Landesligas expanded from three to five and the Bezirksoberligas abolished. All leagues from the Bezirksligas onwards were elevated one tier.

↑ Promoted	↓ Relegated
