= Tobias Schweinsteiger =

German footballer

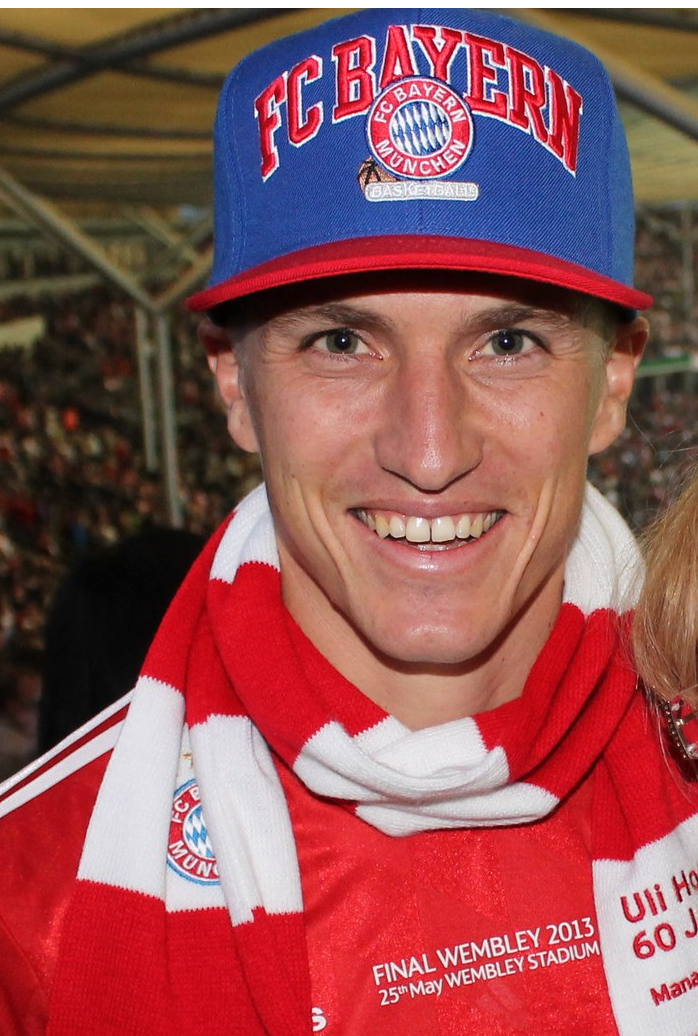
- Schweinsteiger among the Bayern Munich fans at the 2013 Champions League final

Personal information
- Full name: Tobias Schweinsteiger
- Date of birth: 12 March 1982 (age 44)
- Place of birth: Rosenheim, West Germany
- Height: 1.83 m (6 ft 0 in)
- Position: Forward

Youth career
- 1988–1992: FV Oberaudorf
- 1992–1996: 1860 Rosenheim
- 1996–1998: FC Kufstein
- 1998–1999: FV Oberaudorf
- 1999–2001: SpVgg Unterhaching
- 2001–2002: SV Nußdorf

Senior career*
Years	Team	Apps	(Gls)
2002–2003	Falke Markt Schwaben	20	(4)
2003–2004	Jahn Regensburg II	15	(1)
2004	FC Ismaning	20	(8)
2004–2006	VfB Lübeck	46	(18)
2006–2007	Eintracht Braunschweig	20	(3)
2007–2008	VfB Lübeck	12	(2)
2008–2010	SpVgg Unterhaching	82	(22)
2010–2012	Jahn Regensburg	62	(23)
2012–2015	Bayern Munich II	70	(27)
2013	→ SpVgg Unterhaching (loan)	17	(3)
Total		364	(111)

Managerial career
- 2022–2023: VfL Osnabrück
- * Club domestic league appearances and goals

Tobias Schweinsteiger (/ˈtoʊbiəs ˈʃwaɪnʃtaɪɡər/ TOH-bee-əs SHWYNE-shty-gər, German: [ˈtoːbi̯as ˈʃvaɪnʃtaɪɡɐ]; born 12 March 1982) is a German former footballer who played as a forward. He most recently coached VfL Osnabrück. He is the older brother of former German international Bastian Schweinsteiger.

== Career ==
=== Early career ===
Schweinsteiger played youth football for FV Oberaudorf (two spells), his hometown club TSV 1860 Rosenheim, Austrian side FC Kufstein and SpVgg Unterhaching before being released in 2001. He joined Bavarian amateur sides SV Nußdorf and Falke Markt Schwaben and spent eighteen months playing for SSV Jahn Regensburg's reserve team before joining FC Ismaning in 2004. After an impressive half-season with Ismaning, he signed for VfB Lübeck of the Regionalliga Nord just after the beginning of the 2004–05 season.

=== Northern Germany ===
Schweinsteiger made an immediate impact for Lübeck, scoring within one minute of coming on as a substitute on his debut to secure a 1–0 victory over rivals Holstein Kiel. He formed an effective strike partnership with Lars Kampf, with the pair scoring eleven goals each as the club narrowly missed out on promotion to the 2. Bundesliga, finishing in third place. In the summer of 2005, Lübeck signed forwards Kai Hesse and Enrico Neitzel, and this increased competition meant that Schweinsteiger was often used as a substitute, but still managed to score seven goals. Lübeck experienced a repeat of last season's league position, finishing third again, although Schweinsteiger was to ascend to the second division, signing for Eintracht Braunschweig in July 2006.

He made his 2. Bundesliga debut on the fifth matchday of the season, coming on as a substitute for Torsten Lieberknecht in a 2–2 draw with Karlsruher SC. In his next game, three weeks later, he scored two late goals to secure a 2–0 win over 1860 Munich. This proved to be one of only three wins for Braunschweig as they were relegated from the second tier, finishing in last place, by which point Schweinsteiger had found himself less in favour, restricted to mostly substitute appearances in the second half of the season.

After just a year with Braunschweig, Schweinsteiger returned to VfB Lübeck, but this time lasted only six months—he was part of a large exodus in January 2008, after a poor start to the season made it clear that they wouldn't be able to qualify for the new 3. Liga. He returned to SpVgg Unterhaching, for whom he'd played as a youth, and who were now playing in the Regionalliga Süd.

=== Return to Bavaria ===
Schweinsteiger made his Unterhaching debut in a local derby against Bayern Munich II, coming on as a substitute for Thomas Rathgeber and scoring the second goal in a 4–2 win. He ended the season with five goals in thirteen appearances for the club, as they finished sixth to qualify for the inaugural 3. Liga season. He played in Haching's first game at this level, as a substitute for Anton Fink in a 3–0 win over Werder Bremen II, but this was to typify his 2008–09 season: most of his 34 appearances were as a late substitute and as such he only managed three goals has the club narrowly missed out on promotion, finishing 4th. The following season he was a regular starter, and finished as the club's top scorer with fourteen goals, despite the club finishing in a fairly disappointing 11th place.

Unterhaching were forced to cut costs, and Schweinsteiger was one of a number of senior players to leave, joining another of his former clubs, Jahn Regensburg. He had two successful seasons with Regensburg, finishing as top scorer on both occasions with nine and fourteen goals respectively. In the latter season he was club captain as Regensburg finished third, and won promotion to the 2. Bundesliga with a play-off victory over Karlsruher SC.

=== FC Bayern ===
Schweinsteiger was to drop down to the fourth tier, though, to join Bayern Munich II of the Regionalliga Bayern, where his brother, Bastian played for the first team. Along with Stefan Buck and Altin Lala, Tobias was one of three experienced players brought in by coach Mehmet Scholl to help the young team in their bid to earn promotion to the 3. Liga. After a disappointing first half of the 2012–13 season, he returned to SpVgg Unterhaching on a six-month loan in January 2013, as a replacement for the outgoing Florian Niederlechner. Meanwhile, Bayern II finished in second place, missing out on promotion and Schweinsteiger returned to the team for the 2013–14 season. He scored fourteen goals as Bayern II won the division, but missed promotion after losing on away goals to Fortuna Köln in the playoff. Although he was injured for a longer time in the following season, he managed to score seven goals in 22 appearances. It became his last season as an active footballer, since the club told him early on that his expiring contract would not be extended anymore.

== Coaching career ==
=== Early coaching career ===
Schweinsteiger started his coaching career right after his retirement from professional football. In July 2015, Schweinsteiger was hired as an assistant manager of Bayern Munich under-17 team. Schweinsteiger spent two seasons as the assistant manager of the U17 team. In July 2017, Schweinsteiger was promoted as the assistant manager for the Bayern Munich II team. On 9 July 2018, Schweinsteiger was released as the assistant manager of the Bayern Munich II team as Tim Walter left his job as the manager of the Bayern Munich II team. Walter was appointed as the manager of Holstein Kiel and instead of promoting Schweinsteiger to manager, the club appointed Holger Seitz as the new manager of Bayern Munich II. Seitz brought his own assistant manager with him.

Schweinsteiger then became the coach of FC Juniors OÖ. This was announced at the end of December 2018. He then joined Hamburger SV as assistant to Dieter Hecking, but left in 2020 after Hecking's departure. Two weeks later he became assistant to new coach Robert Klauß at 1. FC Nürnberg, where Hecking was now sporting director. Schweinsteiger signed a new contract with Nürnberg in April 2022.

=== VfL Osnabrück ===
In August 2022, he was appointed as the head coach of VfL Osnabrück, taking over from Daniel Scherning with the team near the relegation zone. His contract was renewed in March 2023, having taken the team into the promotion battle.

At the end of the 2022–23 season, Schweinsteiger's Osnabrück achieved a 'historic & dramatic' promotion with a 2-1 win over Borussia Dortmund II in the last game of the season after two goals in injury time. The comeback meant Osnabrück gained three places in the table, beating Wehen Wiesbaden to automatic promotion on goal difference after Wiesbaden had already mistakenly begun celebrating promotion. Under Schweinsteiger, Osnabrück won 19 matches and drew four during the 2022–23 3. Liga season. Also during the 2022–23 season, Schweinsteiger took Osnabrück to the final of the 2022–23 Lower Saxony Cup final. on 14 November 2023, Osnabrück parted ways with Schweinsteiger.

== Career statistics ==
=== Playing career ===
Appearances and goals by club, season and competition
Club	Season	League			National Cup		Other		Total		Ref.
Club	Season	Division	Apps	Goals	Apps	Goals	Apps	Goals	Apps	Goals	Ref.
Falke Markt Schwaben	2002–03	Oberliga Bayern	20	4	—		—		20	4	
Jahn Regensburg II	2002–03	Oberliga Bayern	12	1	—		—		12	1	
Jahn Regensburg II	2003–04	Oberliga Bayern	3	0	—		—		3	0	
Jahn Regensburg II	Total		15	1	—		—		15	1	—
FC Ismaning	2003–04	Oberliga Bayern	13	5	—		—		13	5	
FC Ismaning	2004–05	Oberliga Bayern	7	3	—		—		7	3	
FC Ismaning	Total		20	8	—		—		20	8	—
VfB Lübeck	2004–05	Regionalliga Nord	25	11	—		—		25	11	
VfB Lübeck	2005–06	Regionalliga Nord	21	7	—		—		21	7	
VfB Lübeck	Total		46	18	—		—		46	18	—
Eintracht Braunschweig	2006–07	2. Bundesliga	20	3	—		—		20	3	
VfB Lübeck	2007–08	Regionalliga Nord	12	2	—		—		12	2	
SpVgg Unterhaching	2007–08	Regionalliga Süd	13	5	—		—		13	5	
SpVgg Unterhaching	2008–09	3. Liga	34	3	1	0	—		35	3	
SpVgg Unterhaching	2009–10	3. Liga	35	14	1	0	—		36	14	
SpVgg Unterhaching	Total		82	22	2	0	—		84	22	—
SpVgg Unterhaching II	2008–09	Regionalliga Süd	3	0	—		—		3	0	
Jahn Regensburg	2010–11	3. Liga	31	9	1	0	—		32	9	
Jahn Regensburg	2011–12	3. Liga	31	14	1	1	2 (Note: Appearances in the Promotion playoff)	0	34	15	
Jahn Regensburg	Total		62	23	2	1	2	0	66	24	—
Bayern Munich II	2012–13	Regionalliga Bayern	18	6	—		—		18	6	
SpVgg Unterhaching	2012–13	3. Liga	17	3	—		—		17	3	
Bayern Munich II	2013–14	Regionalliga Bayern	30	14	—		—		30	14	
Bayern Munich II	2014–15	Regionalliga Bayern	22	7	—		2	0	24	7	
Bayern Munich II	Total		52	21	—		2	0	54	21	—
Career Total			367	111	4	1	4	0	375	112	—

=== Coaching record ===
As of match played 11 November 2023

Team	From	To	Record					Ref.
Team	From	To	G	W	D	L	Win %	Ref.
VfL Osnabrück (Note: Record includes matches in the Lower Saxony Cup during the 2022–23 season)	29 August 2022	14 November 2023	48	23	8	17	47.92	

== Personal life ==
In 2006, Schweinsteiger was involved in a car accident that left a 13-year-old girl dead. Police investigation revealed that Schweinsteiger was blameless for the fatal accident.
