= VfB Eichstätt =

- Full name: Verein für Bewegungsspiele Eichstätt e. V. 1920
- Founded: 1 August 1920; 106 years ago
- Ground: Hirsch-Sportpark
- Capacity: 2,090
- Chairman: Thomas Hein
- Manager: Dominik Haußner
- League: Regionalliga Bayern (IV)
- 2025–26: Regionalliga Bayern, 7th of 18
Home colours	Away colours

VfB Eichstätt is a German association football club from the town of Eichstätt, Bavaria. The club was founded in 1920, and the first team competes in the Regionalliga Bayern, one of the fourth tiers of German football. Their home ground is the 2,090-capacity Hirsch-Sportpark.

The club's greatest success came in 2019 when it was runners-up in the Regionalliga Bayern and the Bavarian amateur champion, which qualified the club for the DFB-Pokal.

== History ==
VfB Eichstätt was formed on 1 August 1920 with an initial membership of 90 people.

For most of its history the club has been a non-descript amateur side in local Bavarian football. The club spent considerable time in the local A-Klasse, briefly moving up to the Bezirksliga above in the late 1970s. However, by 1991 VfB dropped to the lowest level of play in the region, the C-Klasse, and remained there for seven seasons. The club began to rise through the league system in the early 2000s, winning the tier seven Bezirksliga Oberbayern-Nord and earning promotion to the Bezirksoberliga Oberbayern in 2006. After two second-place finishes in 2007 and 2008 VfB won this league in 2009 and earned another promotion, now to the Landesliga Bayern-Süd.

In its first Landesliga season the club was a strong contender for another promotion but, after finishing first on equal points with SV Heimstetten, lost a championship decider and then also failed in the promotion round. The second year in the league proved much harder with VfB struggling against relegation and coming only 14th. The third year in the Landesliga, the final season of the Landesliga Süd before it was disbanded, the club came fourth.

The fourth place in the Landesliga in 2011–12 allowed VfB Eichstätt direct qualification for the Bayernliga, where it came ninth in its first year and fourth the season after. After a less successful 2014–15 season the club was moved to the northern division of the Bayernliga for the following one.

In 2016–17 VfB Eichstätt was champion of the northern division of the Bayernliga. Following that the club was promoted to Regionalliga Bayern. At the end of its first season in Regionalliga Bayern the club reached the seventh place. The following season, they were second behind Bayern Munich II, and qualified for the DFB-Pokal, in which they lost 5–1 in the first round to Hertha Berlin.

== Honours ==
The club's honours:

- Champions of C-Klasse: 1999
- Champions of B-Klasse: 2000
- Champions of A-Klasse: 1936, 1948
- Champions of Kreisliga: 1974, 2002
- Champions of Bezirksliga Oberbayern-Nord: 2006
- Champions of Bezirksoberliga Oberbayern: 2009
- Champions of Bayernliga Nord: 2017, 2025
- Bavarian amateur champions: 2019

== Recent seasons ==
The recent season-by-season performance of the club:

Season	Division	Tier	Position
1999–2000	Kreisklasse 1 Ingolstadt	IX	1st ↑
2000–01	Kreisliga Donau-Isar	VIII	6th
2001–02	Kreisliga Donau-Isar	VIII	1st ↑
2002–03	Bezirksliga Oberbayern-Nord	VII	10th
2003–04	Bezirksliga Oberbayern-Nord	VII	8th
2004–05	Bezirksliga Oberbayern-Nord	VII	5th
2005–06	Bezirksliga Oberbayern-Nord	VII	1st ↑
2006–07	Bezirksoberliga Oberbayern	VI	3rd
2007–08	Bezirksoberliga Oberbayern	VI	3rd
2008–09	Bezirksoberliga Oberbayern	VII	1st ↑
2009–10	Landesliga Bayern-Süd	VI	2nd
2010–11	Landesliga Bayern-Süd	VI	14th
2011–12	Landesliga Bayern-Süd	VI	4th ↑
2012–13	Bayernliga Süd	V	9th
2013–14	Bayernliga Süd	V	4th
2014–15	Bayernliga Süd	V	13th
2015–16	Bayernliga Nord	V	2nd
2016–17	Bayernliga Nord	V	1st ↑
2017–18	Regionalliga Bayern	IV	7th
2018–19	Regionalliga Bayern	IV	2nd
2019–21	Regionalliga Bayern	IV	6th
2021–22	Regionalliga Bayern	IV	10th
2022–23	Regionalliga Bayern	IV	16th ↓
2023–24	Bayernliga Nord	V	2nd
2024–25	Bayernliga Nord	V	1st ↑
2025–26	Regionalliga Bayern	IV	7th

- With the introduction of the Bezirksoberligas in 1988 as the new fifth tier, below the Landesligas, all leagues below dropped one tier. With the introduction of the Regionalligas in 1994 and the 3. Liga in 2008 as the new third tier, below the 2. Bundesliga, all leagues below dropped one tier. With the establishment of the Regionalliga Bayern as the new fourth tier in Bavaria in 2012 the Bayernliga was split into a northern and a southern division, the number of Landesligas expanded from three to five and the Bezirksoberligas abolished. All leagues from the Bezirksligas onwards were elevated one tier.

↑ Promoted	↓ Relegated

== Current squad ==
As of 8 September 2026

Note: Flags indicate national team as defined under FIFA eligibility rules; some limited exceptions apply. Players may hold more than one non-FIFA nationality.

No.	Pos.	Nation	Player
1	GK	GER	Daniel Martin
4	DF	GER	Daniel Spies
5	DF	GER	Bastian Bösl
6	DF	GER	Jonas Perconti
7	MF	GER	Lucas Schraufstetter
8	MF	GER	Daniel Hofrichter
9	FW	GER	Moritz Gündling
10	MF	KOS	Aurel Kuqanaj
11	DF	GER	Elias Herger
12	MF	GER	Samuel Schmid
15	MF	GER	Noah Schneider
17	FW	GER	Edis Bakic
19	DF	GER	Markus Müller
20	FW	GER	Timo Meixner

No.	Pos.	Nation	Player
21	GK	GER	Nikolai Sauernheimer
22	FW	GER	Jonas Winkler
23	DF	GER	Florian Lamprecht
24	GK	GER	Jan Sieh
25	DF	TUR	Arif Ekin
27	DF	TUR	Mustafa Fatiras
29	DF	GER	Johannes Mayer
30	FW	GER	Markus Lohner
32	MF	GER	Pascal Schittler
34	MF	GER	Noah Wurm
37	FW	GER	Leon Peric
38	DF	GER	Jens Schüler
39	MF	GER	Jonathan Grimm
