= Ngemba =

Ngemba may refer to:

- Ngemba Evans Obi, Nigerian football player
- Ngemba languages of Cameroon
- Ngiyampaa people, an aggregated group of Aboriginal Australian people of New South Wales
