= Schweinsteiger =

Schweinsteiger is a German-language surname. Notable people with the surname include:

- Ana Schweinsteiger (born Ivanović, 1987), Serbian tennis player.
- Bastian Schweinsteiger (born 1984), German footballer.
- Tobias Schweinsteiger (born 1982), German footballer.
