= Falke Markt Schwaben =

German football club

- Full name: Fußball-Club Falke von 1930 e.V. Markt Schwaben
- Founded: 1930
- Ground: Sportpark Markt Schwaben
- Capacity: 5,000
- Chairman: Oliver Willi
- Manager: Alexander Schmidbauer
- League: Kreisliga München 3 (VIII)
- 2015–16: Kreisklasse München 6 (IX), 1st (promoted)
Home colours	Away colours

Falke Markt Schwaben is a German association football club from the city of Markt Schwaben, Bavaria. Falke is the German word for falcon, with the animal being depicted in the Coats of arms of Markt Schwaben.

== History ==
The club was formed in 1930 through the merger of predecessor sides Ballspiel-Club Markt Schwaben and Deutsche Jugendkraft Markt Schwaben. In the aftermath of World War II the club briefly disappeared when occupying Allied authorities banned organizations across the country, including sports and football clubs, as part of the process of denazification, before being reestablished on 4 November 1945. In 1967, team won its first title and gained promotion to the Landesliga Bayern-Süd where they played for seven seasons before being sent down.

Falke reappeared in Landesliga (V) play in 2001, having spent the previous nine seasons in the Bezirksoberliga Oberbayern, and immediately captured the championship there. They moved up to the Oberliga Bayern (IV) where they played two seasons.

After a 17th place Landesliga (VI) finish in 2011, the team slipped to play in the Bezirksoberliga Oberbayern (VII). At the end of the 2011–12 season the club qualified directly for the newly expanded Landesliga after finishing fourth in the Bezirksoberliga. After two seasons in the Landesliga the club was relegated in 2014, opting to withdraw to the tier nine Kreisklasse where its reserve team played rather than to play in the Bezirksliga.

After two seasons at Kreisklasse level a league championship in 2015–16 took the club back up to the Kreisliga.

== Honours ==
The club's honours:

=== League ===
- Landesliga Bayern-Süd
  - Champions: 2001
- Bezirksoberliga Oberbayern
  - Runners-up: 2000
- Bezirksliga Oberbayern-Ost
  - Champions: 1967, 1991
- Kreisklasse München 6
  - Champions: 2016

== Recent managers ==
Recent managers of the club:

Manager	Start	Finish
Anton Bobenstetter	?	30 June 2010
Robert Lexa	1 July 2010	April 2011
Vitomir Moskovic	April 2011	30 June 2014
Alexander Schmidbauer	1 July 2014	Present

== Recent seasons ==
The recent season-by-season performance of the club:

Season	Division	Tier	Position
1999–2000	Bezirksoberliga Oberbayern	VI	2nd ↑
2000–01	Landesliga Bayern-Süd	V	1st ↑
2001–02	Bayernliga	IV	13th
2002–03	Bayernliga	IV	17th ↓
2003–04	Landesliga Bayern-Süd	V	4th
2004–05	Landesliga Bayern-Süd	V	6th
2005–06	Landesliga Bayern-Süd	V	13th
2006–07	Landesliga Bayern-Süd	V	10th
2007–08	Landesliga Bayern-Süd	V	16th
2008–09	Landesliga Bayern-Süd	VI	13th
2009–10	Landesliga Bayern-Süd	VI	10th
2010–11	Landesliga Bayern-Süd	VI	17th ↓
2011–12	Bezirksoberliga Oberbayern	VII	4th ↑
2012–13	Landesliga Bayern-Südost	VI	10th
2013–14	Landesliga Bayern-Südost	VI	18th ↓
2014–15	Kreisklasse München 6	IX	7th
2015–16	Kreisklasse München 6	IX	1st ↑
2016–17	Kreisliga München 3	VIII	

- With the introduction of the Bezirksoberligas in 1988 as the new fifth tier, below the Landesligas, all leagues below dropped one tier. With the introduction of the Regionalligas in 1994 and the 3. Liga in 2008 as the new third tier, below the 2. Bundesliga, all leagues below dropped one tier. With the establishment of the Regionalliga Bayern as the new fourth tier in Bavaria in 2012 the Bayernliga was split into a northern and a southern division, the number of Landesligas expanded from three to five and the Bezirksoberligas abolished. All leagues from the Bezirksligas onwards were elevated one tier.

↑ Promoted	↓ Relegated

== Stadium ==
The team plays its matches in the Parkstadion, which has a capacity of 5,000.
