= Heribert Deutinger =

German football coach (born 1947)

Personal information
- Date of birth: 13 February 1947 (age 79)
- Place of birth: Munich, West Germany

Managerial career
- Years: Team
- 2004: SpVgg Unterhaching (interim)
- 2005–2007: Spvgg Unterhaching
- 2010–2011: SpVgg Unterhaching II

Heribert Deutinger (born 13 February 1947) is a German football coach who last coached SpVgg Unterhaching II.

== Coaching career ==
Deutinger was assistant coach at Spvgg Unterhaching between July 1993 and April 2004. He became the interim head coach of Unterhaching on 2 April 2004 and was interim head coach until Andreas Brehme was hired as head coach, who started on 1 July 2004. Deutinger first match was a 2–1 win against VfL Osnabrück and Deutinger final match was a 3–3 draw against Erzgebirge Aue. Deutinger finished with a record of three wins, two draws, and three losses. Deutinger returned to his role as assistant coach under Brehme. Deutinger was hired as head coach on 11 April 2005. Deutinger's first match was a 2–0 win against Karlsruher SC on 17 April 2005. Deutinger guided Unterhaching to 14th place in the 2005–06 2.Bundesliga season and to the quarter–finals of the 2005–06 German Cup. On 19 March 2007, Deutinger and Unterhaching parted ways "by mutual agreement". Deutinger's final match was a 3–0 loss to SC Paderborn 07 on 18 March 2007, which left Unterhaching in 16th place in the 2006–07 2. Bundesliga season. Deutinger finished with a record of 22 wins, 14 draws, and 30 losses. Deutinger returned to Unterhaching to become head coach of their reserve team between 1 July 2010 and 30 June 2011. Unterhaching II finished the 2010–11 season in seventh place.

== Coaching record ==
Team	From	To	Record								Ref.
Team	From	To	M	W	D	L	GF	GA	GD	Win %	Ref.
SpVgg Unterhaching (interim)	2 April 2004	30 June 2004	8	3	2	3	10	11	−1	37.50	
SpVgg Unterhaching	11 April 2005	19 March 2007	82	36	14	32	81	90	−9	43.90	
SpVgg Unterhaching II	1 July 2010	30 June 2011	34	15	6	13	53	44	+9	44.12	
Total			124	54	22	48	144	145	−1	43.55	—
