= FT Starnberg 09 =

German sports club

- Full name: Freie Turner Starnberg 09 e.V.
- Nickname(s): Seelöwen (Sea lions)
- Founded: 1909
- Chairman: Franz Holzinger
- League: A-Klasse Zugspitze (X)
- 2022–23: 2nd
Home colours	Away colours

The FT Starnberg 09 is a German association football club from the town of Starnberg, Bavaria. Apart from football, the club also offers other sports like tennis and volleyball.

The club experienced its greatest success under the name of FC Starnberg, which was a merger club of the football department of FT and SpVgg Starnberg, active from 1992 to 2001. In 2001, FC was dissolved and the footballers returned to FT. FC Starnberg spent its entire nine-year history in the Fußball-Bayernliga, with two third-place finishes as its best results.

== History ==
=== FT Starnberg 09 ===
The FT Starnberg 09 was formed on 9 May 1909. After the First World War, in 1919, the club established a football department, which initially played under the name of FC Vorwärts Starnberg. In 1933, with the rise of the Nazis to power, FT 09 was outlawed and its assets confiscated and handed over to the SA. The club was reformed after the Second World War, in 1947, but it took until 1951 to receive all its assets back, at which time the football department was restarted again, too.

The football department of FT 09 never rose above local amateur level, until the team became a founding member of the Bezirksoberliga Oberbayern in 1988 and played at this level for two seasons before dropping down to the Bezirksliga Oberbayern-Süd in 1990. From this league, the club promptly suffered relegation, too.

In 1992, the football department of the club left FT to merge with SpVgg Starnberg, a club playing in the Landesliga who had spent one season at Bayernliga level in 1989–90. SpVgg Starnberg had been established in 1912 and, apart from its one year in the Bayernliga, spend a number of seasons in the Landesliga Bayern-Süd from 1975 to 1981, 1986 to 1989 and again from 1990 to 1992.

=== FC Starnberg ===
FC made its Bayernliga debut in 1992–93, finishing eighth. After an eleventh place in the following year, the club entered its most successful era, finishing in the top five for the next three seasons. After this, the club dropped into the bottom half of the table, surviving in the mid field for another three years. Finally, in 2000–01, the club fell to relegation, finishing 19th in the league. FC Starnberg was promptly dissolved and the footballers returned to FT Starnberg 09, with the other merger club, SpVgg Starnberg, not reformed.

=== FT Starnberg 09 again ===
The team, under its new, old name, was promptly relegated from the Landesliga, too, but immediately returned on the strength of a Bezirksoberliga Oberbayern title. The club played in the Landesliga for three seasons from 2003 to 2006 before being relegated again. From 2006 to 2012 the club played as an upper table side in the Bezirksoberliga. At the end of the 2011–12 season the club qualified directly for the newly expanded Landesliga after finishing fourth in the Bezirksoberliga.

The club lasted for only one season in the Landesliga, being relegated straight back to the Bezirksliga. The 2013–14 Bezirksliga season saw the club lose all but one of their season games and being relegated to the Kreisliga, having come a distant last in the Bezirksliga. Another relegation followed in 2015, now to the Kreisklasse. During the 2015–16 season, in which the club did not win a single point, the team was withdrawn because of a lack of players, forcing the club to restart in the lowest division, the C-Klasse, for the following season. In 2017–18, Starnberg withdrew its first team from the Bavarian leagues after three games, all loses, and sat out the next season, making a return in 2019–20 after forming a joint team in the 11th-tier B-Klasse with neighbouring SV Söcking to form SG Söcking/Starnberg. From the 23/24 season onwards, the under 19s of the club were supported by a fan group known as Ultras Starnberg though their small Bluesky and X, formerly Twitter account, recognizable by their "Ultras" banner, consisting of around 3 to 4 people.

== Honours ==
The club's honours:

=== League ===
- Landesliga Bayern-Süd
  - Champions: 1989^{†}, 1992^{†}
- Bezirksoberliga Oberbayern
  - Champions: 2003
- Bezirksliga Oberbayern-Süd
  - Champions: 1975^{†}, 1986^{†}
  - Runners-up: 1973^{†}
- ^{†} Won by SpVgg Starnberg

== Recent seasons ==
The recent season-by-season performance of the club:

Season	Division	Tier	Position
1999–2000	Bayernliga	IV	11th
2000–01	Bayernliga	IV	19th ↓
2001–02	Landesliga Bayern-Süd	V	16th ↓
2002–03	Bezirksoberliga Oberbayern	VI	1st ↑
2003–04	Landesliga Bayern-Süd	V	12th
2004–05	Landesliga Bayern-Süd	V	13th
2005–06	Landesliga Bayern-Süd	V	17th ↓
2006–07	Bezirksoberliga Oberbayern	VI	9th
2007–08	Bezirksoberliga Oberbayern	VI	9th
2008–09	Bezirksoberliga Oberbayern	VII	4th
2009–10	Bezirksoberliga Oberbayern	VII	5th
2010–11	Bezirksoberliga Oberbayern	VII	6th
2011–12	Bezirksoberliga Oberbayern	VII	5th ↑
2012–13	Landesliga Bayern-Südost	VI	18th ↓
2013–14	Bezirksliga Oberbayern-Süd	VII	16th ↓
2014–15	Kreisliga Zugspitze 1	VIII	14th ↓
2015–16	Kreisklasse Zugspitze 1	IX	15th ↓
2016–17	C-Klasse Zugspitze	XII	4th
2017–18	C-Klasse Zugspitze	XII	11th
2018–19	Inactive		
2019–20	B-Klasse Zugspitze 5	XI	4
2021–22	B-Klasse Zugspitze 5	XI	1st ↑
2022–23	A-Klasse 6	X	2nd

- With the introduction of the Bezirksoberligas in 1988 as the new fifth tier, below the Landesligas, all leagues below dropped one tier. With the introduction of the Regionalligas in 1994 and the 3. Liga in 2008 as the new third tier, below the 2. Bundesliga, all leagues below dropped one tier. With the establishment of the Regionalliga Bayern as the new fourth tier in Bavaria in 2012 the Bayernliga was split into a northern and a southern division, the number of Landesligas expanded from three to five and the Bezirksoberligas abolished. All leagues from the Bezirksligas onward were elevated one tier.

↑ Promoted	↓ Relegated
