= Landesliga Bayern-Südost =

- Founded: 2012
- Country: Germany
- State: Bavaria
- Number of clubs: 18
- Level on pyramid: Level 6
- Promotion to: Bayernliga
- Relegation to: Bezirksliga
- Current champions: SV Erlbach (2021–22)

The Landesliga Bayern-Südost (English: State league Bavaria-Southeast) is currently the sixth tier of the German football league system in south eastern Bavaria and the third tier of the Bavarian football league system.

It is one of five Landesligas in Bavaria, the other four being the Landesliga Südwest, Landesliga Mitte, Landesliga Nordost and Landesliga Nordwest. The league champion automatically qualifies for the Bayernliga, the runners-up needs to compete with the runners-up of the other four Landesligas and a number of Bayernliga teams for another promotion spot.

The league replaced the Landesliga Bayern-Süd and the Landesliga Bayern-Mitte at this level, both formed in 1963, with the former disbanded in 2012 while the latter was reduced in area of coverage. The new Landesliga Südost covers eastern Upper Bavaria, formerly part of the Landesliga Süd and southern Lower Bavaria, formerly part of the Landesliga Mitte.

== History ==
=== Formation ===
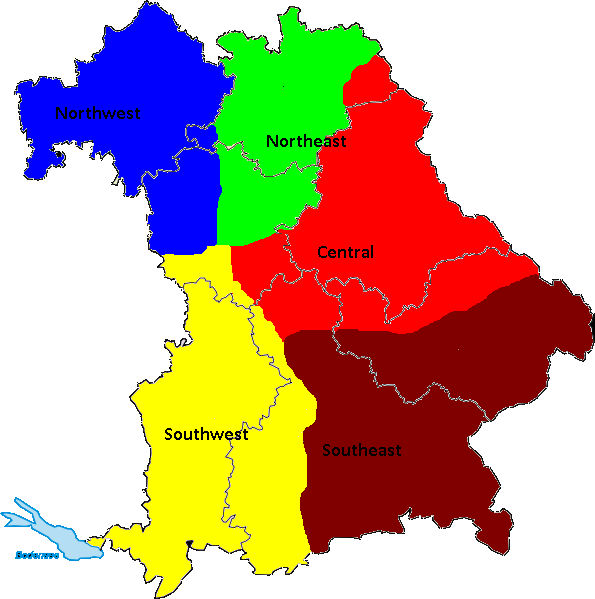
The Landesligas from 2012 onwards.

The Bavarian Football Association carried out drastic changes to the league system at the end of the 2011–12 season. With the already decided introduction of the Regionalliga Bayern from 2012 to 2013, it also placed two Bayernligas below the new league as the new fifth tier of the German league system, splitting the previously single division league into a northern and a southern group. Below those, five Landesligas instead of the existing three were set, which were geographically divided to limit travel and increase the number of local derbies.

Clubs from three different league tiers were able to qualify for the new league. From the Landesliga level, the clubs placed ninth to 15th had the opportunity to qualify for the Bayernliga through play-offs. Those clubs who failed to qualify for the Bayernliga were grouped in the Landesliga. The Landesliga clubs placed 16th, 17th and 18th automatically went to the Landesliga. The Bezirksoberliga (BOL) champions also had the chance to qualify for the Bayernliga. Those clubs who failed went to the Landesliga, alongside the BOL teams placed second to sixth. The teams placed seventh to tenth entered a play-off with the Bezirksliga champions for the remaining Landesliga spots.

The league started out with 18 clubs in its inaugural season, the clubs coming from the following leagues:

- From the Landesliga Bayern-Süd (VI): TSV Eching, SV Pullach, SV Kirchanschöring
- From the Landesliga Bayern-Mitte (VI): FC Ergolding
- From the Bezirksoberliga Niederbayern (VII): ETSV 09 Landshut, TSV Waldkirchen, SpVgg Plattling, 1. FC Passau, FC Dingolfing, FC Vilshofen
- From the Bezirksoberliga Oberbayern (VII): SC Eintracht Freising, VfR Garching, SC Kirchheim, Falke Markt Schwaben, FT Starnberg 09, FC Deisenhofen, TuS Holzkirchen, TSV Ampfing

=== Seasons ===
The opening game of the new league took place on 18 July 2012 when FC Ergolding hosted ETSV Landshut 09 and won 3–2. At the end of the 2012–13 season, league champions SV Pullach were directly promoted while runners-up VfR Garching earned promotion via the promotion round. At the other end of the table, SpVgg Plattling, FC Dingolfing and FT Starnberg 09 were directly relegated, while FC Vilshofen and ETSV 09 Landshut had to enter the promotion/relegation round with the Bezirksliga runners-up. ETSV 09 Landshut was relegated after losing to TSV Grünwald while FC Vilshofen lost to TuS Pfarrkirchen. For the 2013–14 season five clubs were promoted to the league, TuS Pfarrkirchen, SV Hebertsfelden, VfB Hallbergmoos, SV Erlbach, and SV Türkgücü-Ataspor München. Apart from these five sides the league also received TSV Dachau and FC Gerolfing who moved to the Südost division from the Südwest after the 2012–13 season.

The 2019–20 season was interrupted by the coronavirus disease pandemic in Germany that began in March 2020. It was later suspended until 31 August, forcing a cancellation of the 2020–21 season as the BFV approved a resumption of the preceding one, which was curtailed in May 2021.

== Modus ==
The league is played in a home-and-away format with the league champion being directly promoted to the Bayernliga. The runners-up enters a promotion round with the other four Landesliga runners-up and the Bayernliga teams placed just above the direct relegation ranks, 15th and 16th in the south and 15th in the north, for additional spots in this league. The bottom three teams from the Landesliga are directly relegated to the Bezirksligas. The teams placed 14th and 15th have to play-off with the Bezirksliga runners-up for their place in the Landesliga.

== Top-three of the Landesliga ==
The following teams have finished in the top-three in the league:

Season	Champions	Runners-up	Third
2012–13	SV Pullach	**VfR Garching**	1. FC Passau
2013–14	TSV Dachau	TuS Holzkirchen	SV Erlbach
2014–15	SV Kirchanschöring	**SV Erlbach**	VfB Hallbergmoos
2015–16	FC Ismaning	FC Deisenhofen	VfB Hallbergmoos
2016–17	TuS Holzkirchen	**SB Chiemgau Traunstein**	ASV Dachau
2017–18	Türkgücü-Ataspor München	SC Eintracht Freising	FC Deisenhofen
2018–19	TSV 1880 Wasserburg	**FC Deisenhofen**	VfB Hallbergmoos
2019–21	VfB Hallbergmoos	SV Erlbach	TSV Eintracht Karlsfeld
2021–22	SV Erlbach	FC Unterföhring	FC SF Schwaig

- Promoted teams in **bold**.
- The 2019–20 season was suspended and later extended to 2021, when it was curtailed and the top three were ranked on a points per game basis.

== League placings ==
The complete list of clubs and placings in the league since inception in 2012:

Club	13	14	15	16	17	18	19	20	21	22	23
VfR Garching	2	**B**	**R**	**B**	**R**	**R**	**R**	**R**	**R**	**B**	**B**
SV Pullach	**1**	**B**	**B**	**B**	**B**	**B**	**B**	**B**	**B**	**B**	x
TSV 1865 Dachau	7^{‡}	**1**	**B**	**B**	**B**	**B**	**B**	**B**	**B**	**B**	**B**
SV Kirchanschöring	6	5	**1**	**B**	**B**	**B**	**B**	**B**	**B**	**B**	**B**
FC Ismaning	**B**	**B**	8	**1**	**B**	**B**	**B**	**B**	**B**	**B**	**B**
Türkgücü-Ataspor München		12	10	12	6	**1**	**B**	**R**	**3L**	**3L**	**R**
TSV 1880 Wasserburg							**1**	**B**	**B**	**B**	x
FC Deisenhofen	11	13	5	2	5	3	2	**B**	**B**	**B**	**B**
VfB Hallbergmoos		8	3	3	9	8	3	2	**1**	**B**	**B**
SV Erlbach		3	2	**B**	11	10	12	4	2	**1**	**B**
FC Unterföhring	**B**	**B**	**B**	**B**	**B**	**R**	**B**	7	9	2	x
FC SF Schwaig										3	x
TSV Eintracht Karlsfeld					14		9	1	3	4	x
SC Eintracht Freising	4	6	4	4	10	2	4	3	6	5	x
TSV Bogen	**1**^{+}	**B**	**B**	**B**	**B**	8^{+}	10	15^{+}	11^{+}	5^{+}	x^{+}
TuS Holzkirchen	12	2	7	7	**1**	**B**	**B**	13	12	6	x
FC Sturm Hauzenberg				6^{+}	9^{+}	3^{+}	6^{+}	12	11	6^{+}	x^{+}
SpVgg Landshut	**B**	**B**	**B**	10	4	4	7	14	14	7	x
SSV Eggenfelden										8	x
TSV Grünwald						11	6	5	5	9	x
TuS Geretsried				9	8	5	7^{‡}	14^{‡}	5^{‡}	9^{‡}	x
SV Brückmuhl										10	x
TSV Brunnthal										11	x
Kirchheimer SC	5	14	13	16				9	10	12	x
TSV Ampfing	13	17						16	16	13	x
SB Chiemgau Traunstein				8	2	**B**	14	6	4	14	x
1. FC Passau	3	15					11^{+}	10	8	14^{+}	x^{+}
TV Aiglsbach						18		12^{†}	9^{†}	15	
SB/DJK Rosenheim	**B**	**B**	**B**	6	15	14	13	11	15	16	
FC Töging			6	11	12	6	8	8	7	17	
TSV Kastl					7	12	11	15	13	18	
ASV Dachau			11	5	3	7	5	17	17		x
TSV Waldkirchen	9	4	10^{+}	12^{+}	8^{+}	2^{+}	9^{+}	18	18		
TuS Pfarrkirchen						9	15				
FC Moosinning							16				
ASCK Simbach am Inn							17				
TSV Neuried						13	18				
ESV Freilassing					13	15					
TSV Moosach bei Grafing						16					
SV Manching	17^{‡}			14		17					
TSV Eching	7	11	9	13	16						
TSV Vilsbiburg					17						
FC Gerolfing	9^{‡}	9	12	15							
SV Planegg-Krailling			13^{‡}	17							
TSV Velden				18							
TuS Pfarrkirchen		10	14								
SV Hebertsfelden		16	15								
FC Ergolding	8	7	16								
FC Falke Markt Schwaben	10	18									
FC Vilshofen	14										
ETSV 09 Landshut	15										
SpVgg Plattling	16										
FC Dingolfing	17										
FT Starnberg 09	18										
VfB Forstinning											x

- Placings for 2020 were based on the table at the point of suspension during the coronavirus pandemic. Final placings were after the curtailment of the resumed 2019–20 season in 2021.

=== Key ===
Symbol	Key
**3L**	3. Liga
**R**	Regionalliga Bayern
**B**	Bayernliga
**1**	League champions
Place	League
Place^{‡}	Played in the Southwest division that season.
Place^{+}	Played in the Central division that season.
Blank	Played at a league level below this league
