= Ngemba Evans Obi =

Nigerian footballer

Ngemba Obi
Personal information
- Full name: Evans Ngemba Obi
- Date of birth: 29 May 1985 (age 41)
- Place of birth: Owerri, Nigeria
- Height: 1.80 m (5 ft 11 in)
- Position: Goalkeeper

Youth career
- 2005–2008: Academy Africa

Senior career*
Years	Team	Apps	(Gls)
2008–2009	SV Heimstetten II	18	(0)
2009–2011	SC Fürstenfeldbruck II	5	(0)
2011–	TSV Grünwald		

International career
2008	Nigeria	0	(0)
- * Club domestic league appearances and goals

Evans Ngemba Obi (born 29 May 1985 in Owerri) is a Nigerian football goalkeeper who is playing for TSV Grünwald in the German Bezirksliga Oberbayern-Süd.

== Career ==
Obi began his career 2005 with Academy Africa in München and had a trial with SV Heimstetten in June 2008, one month later was transferred to SV Heimstetten.

He was the first keeper for the reserve team from SV Heimstetten who plays in the German Kreisklasse 6 and the third keeper of the first team, who plays in the Landesliga Bayern. After 18 games in the Kreisklasse 6 for SV Heimstetten II left in July 2009 the club and joined than to SC Fürstenfeldbruck II. In summer 2011 signed for German Bezirksliga Oberbayern-Süd club TSV Grünwald.

== International career ==
His first nominatation for the Super Eagles was on 18 November 2008.

== Background ==
Obi was the first player ever from his former club SV Heimstetten who was nominated for a national game.
