= Bezirksliga Oberbayern-Ost =

- Founded: 1963
- Country: Germany
- State: Bavaria
- Number of clubs: 15
- Level on pyramid: Level 7
- Promotion to: Landesliga
- Relegation to: Kreisliga Inn/Salzach 1; Kreisliga Inn/Salzach 2; Kreisliga München 3
- Current champions: SV Bruckmühl (2019–21)

The Bezirksliga Oberbayern-Ost (English: District league Upper Bavaria-East) is currently the seventh tier of the German football league system in the eastern part of the Bavarian Regierungsbezirk of Upper Bavaria (German: Oberbayern). Until the disbanding of the Bezirksoberliga Oberbayern in 2012 it was the eighth tier. From 2008, when the 3. Liga was introduced, was the seventh tier of the league system, until the introduction of the Regionalligas in 1994 the sixth tier. From the league's inception in 1963 to the introduction of the Bezirksoberliga in 1988 it was the fifth tier.

== Overview ==
=== History ===
Before the Bezirksoberligas in Bavaria were introduced in 1988 the Bezirksligas were the leagues set right below the Landesligas Bayern in the football pyramid from 1963 onwards, when the Landesligas were established. Until the establishment of the Bezirksoberliga, the league champions were not automatically promoted but instead had to play-off for promotion as there was five Bezirksligas feeding the Landesliga but initially only three, later four promotion spots.

In 1988, when the Bezirksoberligas were introduced, the league lost some of its status as it was relegated one tier. On a positive note, the league champions were now always promoted and the league runners-up had the opportunity to play-off for promotion as well.

With the league reform at the end of the 2011–12 season, which included an expansion of the number of Landesligas from three to five, the Bezirksoberligas were disbanded. Instead, the Bezirksligas took the place of the Bezirksoberligas once more below the Landesligas.

The following qualifying modus applied at the end of the 2011–12 season:

- Champions: Promotion round to the Landesliga, winners to the Landesliga, losers to the Bezirksliga.
- Teams placed 2nd to 12th: Remain in the Bezirksliga.
- Teams placed 13th to 16th: Directly relegated to Kreisliga.

=== Format ===
The winner of the Bezirksliga Oberbayern-Ost, like the winner of the Bezirksliga Oberbayern-Nord and Bezirksliga Oberbayern-Süd was, until 2011, directly promoted to the Bezirksoberliga Oberbayern. The runners-up of the Bezirksligas in Upper Bavaria would take part in a promotion round with the best-placed Bezirksoberliga team which did finish on a relegation rank to determine one or more additional promotion spots, depending on availability. From the 2012–13 season onwards, the league champion will be promoted to the Landesliga Bayern-Südost.

The bottom three teams of each group are relegated to one of the Kreisligas. At the same time the Kreisliga champions were promoted to the Bezirksliga. The runners-up of the Kreisligas faced a play-off with each other and the 12th placed teams in the Bezirksliga.

The Bezirksliga Oberbayern-Ost is fed by the following Kreisligas:

- Kreisliga Inn/Salzach 1
- Kreisliga Inn/Salzach 2
- Kreisliga München 3

Since 1995, the league has generally operated with a strength of 16 clubs and rarely deviated from this.

=== League timeline ===
The league went through the following timeline of positions in the league system:

Years	Name	Tier	Promotion to
1963–88	Bezirksliga Oberbayern-Ost	V	Landesliga Bayern-Süd
1988–94	Bezirksliga Oberbayern-Ost	VI	Bezirksoberliga Oberbayern
1994–2008	Bezirksliga Oberbayern-Ost	VII	Bezirksoberliga Oberbayern
2008–12	Bezirksliga Oberbayern-Ost	VIII	Bezirksoberliga Oberbayern
2012–	Bezirksliga Oberbayern-Ost	VII	Landesliga Bayern

== League champions ==
The winners and runners–up of the league:

=== 1963–88 ===
The league champions and runners–up while being a feeder league to the Landesliga:

**Season**	**Champions**	**Runners–up**
1963–64		
1964–65		
1965–66		
1966–67		
1967–68		
1968–69		
1969–70		
1970–71		
1971–72	**TSV 1860 Rosenheim**	FC Traunstein
1972–73	**TSV 1860 Munich Am.**	TSV Ottobrunn
1973–74	**TSV Ottobrunn**	TSV Teisendorf
1974–75	TSV Ampfing	TSV Trostberg
1975–76	**SV Kirchanschöring**	TSV Ampfing
1976–77	**SB/DJK Rosenheim**	
1977–78	**TSV Ampfing**	
1978–79	SV Waldperlach	
1979–80	Wacker Burghausen	**TSV 1860 Munich Am.**
1980–81	**FC Moosinning**	Wacker Burghausen
1981–82	**TSV Marktl**	Wacker Burghausen
1982–83	**Wacker Burghausen**	1. FC Traunstein
1983–84	**TSV Marktl**	1. FC Traunstein
1984–85	**SV Türk Gücü München**	**SV Gartenstadt Trudering**
1985–86	**TuS Raubling**	
1986–87	ESV Freilassing	TSV Trostberg
1987–88	**FC Moosinning**	**ESV Freilassing**

=== 1988–2012 ===
The league champions and runners–up while being a feeder league to the Bezirksoberliga:

**Season**	**Champions**	**Runners–up**
1988–89	**TSV Bad Endorf**	**1. FC Miesbach**
1989–90	**SV Gendorf**	SV Aschau/Inn
1990–91	**Falke Markt Schwaben**	**FC Traunstein**
1991–92	**TSV Wasserburg**	SpVgg Unterhaching II
1992–93	**TSV Ottobrunn**	**SB/DJK Rosenheim**
1993–94	**FC Ismaning**	**SVG Trudering**
1994–95	**FC Deisenhofen**	TSV Wasserburg
1995–96	**SpVgg Unterhaching II**	TSV Wasserburg
1996–97	**TSV Ebersberg**	SV Heimstetten
1997–98	**SV Heimstetten**	**SV Gendorf**
1998–99	**TSV Marktl**	**Wacker Burghausen II**
1999–2000	**SC Baldham** ^{+}	**VfL Waldkraiburg** ^{+}
2000–01	**TSV Reischach**	TSV Buchbach
2001–02	**SV Kirchanschöring**	**SB/DJK Rosenheim**
2002–03	**SK Srbija München**	**TSV Buchbach**
2003–04	**TSV Ottobrunn**	**SV Kirchanschöring**
2004–05	**TSV Wasserburg**	SV Erlbach
2005–06	**SV Erlbach**	**FC Perach**
2006–07	**ESV Freilassing**	**TSV Wasserburg**
2007–08	**FC Traunstein** ^{+}	TSV Ampfing ^{+}
2008–09	**TSV Ampfing**	TSV Peterskirchen
2009–10	**SC Baldham**	**SC Kirchheim**
2010–11	**1. FC Miesbach**	TSV 1860 Rosenheim II
2011–12	TSV 1860 Rosenheim II	TSV Ebersberg

=== 2012–present ===
The league champions and runners–up while being a feeder league to the Landesliga once more:

**Season**	Champions	**Runners–up**
2012–13	SV Erlbach	ESV Freilassing
2013–14	FC Töging	TSV Ebersberg
2014–15	SB Chiemgau	SV-DJK Kolbermoor
2015–16	ESV Freilassing	TSV Kastl
2016–17	TSV Moosach bei Grafing	VfB Forstinning
2017–18	TSV 1880 Wasserburg	SV Saaldorf
2018–19	TSV Ampfing	ESV Freilassing
2019–21	SV Bruckmühl	VfB Forstinning

- Promoted teams in **bold**.
- ^{+} Teams finished on equal points, decider needed to determine final position.
- Season was suspended in 2020 and then extended to 2021, when it was curtailed. Champion and runner-up were ranked on a points per game basis.

== Current clubs ==
The clubs in the league in the 2021–22 season and their 2019–21 final positions:

Club	Position
VfB Forstinning	2nd
ESV Freilassing	3rd
SV Reichertsheim	4th
SVN München	5th
SC Baldham-Vaterstetten	6th
TSV Bad Endorf	7th
SV Saaldorf	8th
TSV Buchbach II	9th
SpVgg Haidhausen	10th
TSV Dorfen	11th
FC Aschheim	12th
TSV Otterfing	Promoted from the Kreisliga
TSV Siegsdorf	Promoted from the Kreisliga
SV Waldperlach	Promoted from the Kreisliga
SV Westerndorf St. Peter	Promoted from the Kreisliga
