= VfR Garching =

- Full name: Verein für Rasenspiele Garching 1921 e.V.
- Founded: 1921
- Ground: Stadion am See
- Capacity: 4,000
- Chairman: Uwe Cygan
- Manager: Daniel Weber
- League: Bayernliga (V)
- 2021–22: 11th
Home colours	Away colours	Third colours

The VfR Garching is a German association football club from the city of Garching, Bavaria.

The club's greatest success has been promotion to the Regionalliga Bayern in 2014, the fourth tier of the German football league system.

== History ==
For most of its history the club has been a non-descript amateur side in local Bavarian football. The club was formed in 1921, purely as a football club. VfR struggled in the era before the Second World War to find a suitable home ground, moving frequently and eventually having to cease playing football altogether in 1937 when their home ground had to make way for the new Autobahn 9 from Munich to Berlin. The club reformed after the war, on 1 March 1946, seeing itself as a continuation of the old VfR Garching but now being named FC Garching. In 1949 the club reverted to its old name VfR. in 1973 the club opened itself to become a multi-sports club rather than only offering football, adding other departments over the years.

VfR Garching rose above local football for the first time in 1986 when it won promotion to the Bezirksliga Oberbayern-Nord, then the fifth tier of the league system. The club failed to qualify for the new Bezirksoberliga Oberbayern in 1988 but gradually improved in the Bezirksliga below, finishing third in 1989, second in 1990 and won the league in 1991.

The later result allowed the club to move up to the Bezirksoberliga, where it would play the next four seasons. After a fourth place in its first season there the team gradually declined and, in 1995, was relegated back to the Bezirksliga. Two seasons later the club dropped down from this level, too, back into local amateur football. Garching made a brief return to the Bezirksliga in the 2003–04 season but was promptly relegated again.

The club's rise through the league system began in 2005 when it won another promotion to the Bezirksliga and was, this time, able to establish itself there again. In 2009 a runners-up finish in the Bezirksliga took the team back up to the Bezirksoberliga. This league was disbanded in 2012 and VfR qualified for the new Landesliga Bayern-Südost on the strength of a second-place finish. The next two seasons the club would also come second in its league each time and, in turn, earn promotion, first in the Landesliga, then in the southern division of the Bayernliga. Because of the withdrawal of league champions BC Aichach, Garching received the direct promotion spot to the Regionalliga, thereby entering the Regionalliga Bayern for the first time in 2014–15. The club finished sixteenth in the Regionalliga and was forced to enter the relegation round against the Bayernliga runners-up where it lost to FC Amberg and was relegated. The club won the Bayernliga Süd in 2016 and was promoted back to the Regionalliga.

== Honours ==
The club's honours:

- Bayernliga Süd (V)
  - Champions: 2016
  - Runners-up: 2014
- Landesliga Bayern-Südost (VI)
  - Runners-up: 2013
- Bezirksoberliga Oberbayern (VII)
  - Runners-up: 2012
- Bezirksliga Oberbayern-Nord (VI-VIII)
  - Champions: 1991, 2009
  - Runners-up: 1990
- Kreisliga München 4 (VIII)
  - Champions: 2005

== Recent seasons ==
The recent season-by-season performance of the club:

Season	Division	Tier	Position
1999–2000			
2000–01			
2001–02			
2002–03	Kreisliga München	VIII	↑
2003–04	Bezirksliga Oberbayern-Nord	VII	13th ↓
2004–05	Kreisliga München 4	VIII	1st ↑
2005–06	Bezirksliga Oberbayern-Nord	VII	9th
2006–07	Bezirksliga Oberbayern-Nord	VII	8th
2007–08	Bezirksliga Oberbayern-Nord	VII	4th
2008–09	Bezirksliga Oberbayern-Nord	VIII	2nd ↑
2009–10	Bezirksoberliga Oberbayern	VII	4th
2010–11	Bezirksoberliga Oberbayern	VII	3rd
2011–12	Bezirksoberliga Oberbayern	VII	2nd ↑
2012–13	Landesliga Bayern-Südost	VI	2nd ↑
2013–14	Bayernliga Süd	V	2nd ↑
2014–15	Regionalliga Bayern	IV	16th ↓
2015–16	Bayernliga Süd	V	1st ↑
2016–17	Regionalliga Bayern	IV	11th
2017–18	Regionalliga Bayern	IV	4th
2018–19	Regionalliga Bayern	IV	

- With the introduction of the Bezirksoberligas in 1988 as the new fifth tier, below the Landesligas, all leagues below dropped one tier. With the introduction of the Regionalligas in 1994 and the 3. Liga in 2008 as the new third tier, below the 2. Bundesliga, all leagues below dropped one tier. With the establishment of the Regionalliga Bayern as the new fourth tier in Bavaria in 2012 the Bayernliga was split into a northern and a southern division, the number of Landesligas expanded from three to five and the Bezirksoberligas abolished. All leagues from the Bezirksligas onwards were elevated one tier.

=== Key ===
↑ Promoted	↓ Relegated
