= SpVgg Unterhaching II =

- Full name: Spielvereinigung Unterhaching e.V.
- Nickname: Haching
- Founded: 1 January 1925
- Ground: Stadion Grünau
- Capacity: 4,000
- League: Landesliga Bayern-Südost (VI)
- 2024–25: Bayernliga Süd, 16th of 17 (relegated via play-offs)
Home colours	Away colours

The SpVgg Unterhaching II is the reserve team of German football club SpVgg Unterhaching, from the Unterhaching suburb of the city of Munich, Bavaria.

At times, the team played under the name of SpVgg Unterhaching Amateure but since 2005, it carries its current name. The team's greatest success has been a single season in the tier four Regionalliga Süd in 2008–09. Since then it has been playing in the Bayernliga until being disbanded at the end of the 2014–15 season, but returning to the football from 2024-25 season.

== History ==
Unterhachings reserve team, for the most part of its history, played in the lower amateur leagues of Bavaria, when the club fielded a reserve side at all. The club's first team only entered the upper reaches of Bavarian football itself in the late 1970s, earning promotion to the Amateur Oberliga Bayern (III), the Bayernliga, in 1981.

With the rise of the first team, the fortunes of its reserve side improved, too, the side leaving the Munich amateur leagues for the first time in 1990, when it won promotion to the tier-six Bezirksliga Oberbayern-Ost.

The team remained a mid-table side, with the exception of a runners-up finish in 1992, until 1996, when it won the league and earned promotion to the Bezirksoberliga Oberbayern.

In the Bezirksoberliga, Unterhaching II played for three seasons before earning another championship and being promoted to the Landesliga Bayern-Süd in 1999. In this league, the team became a promotion contender in its first season, but in the end finished third, outside the ranks that would have allowed it to move up. In its second year, it managed a second-place finish and earned promotion through the promotion round, entering the Bayernliga for 2001-02.

The first three seasons in the Bayernliga, the team performed quite well, earning upper-table finishes. From 2005, its performances fell off, culminating in a thirteenth place in 2006-07.

With the introduction of the 3. Liga in 2008, the 2007-08 season held a special opportunity for the clubs in the Bayernliga, the top four teams in the league were to be promoted to the Regionalliga Süd to make up for half of this league moving up to the new third division. Unterhaching II was never really in contention for those four spots, finishing ninth in the league that year. When however the league champions SpVgg Bayreuth were refused a Regionalliga licence and the Sportfreunde Siegen had to withdraw from the Regionalliga, two additional teams were admitted from Bavaria to this league. 1. FC Eintracht Bamberg, fifth placed, took up one spot but none of the clubs on the places six to eight had applied or been granted a Regionalliga licence and therefore Unterhaching II was admitted to the league for 2008-09.

Not helped by this late addition, the team fared poorly in the 2008-09 season, coming a distant last, twenty points clear of a non-relegation rank, only equal to fellow promoted side and struggler TSV Großbardorf.

In 2010-11, the team plays in the Bayernliga once more. As the reserve side of a 3. Liga club the team was unable to qualify for the new Regionalliga Bayern but retained its place in the Bayernliga, entering the southern division of the newly divided league from 2012.

In March 2015 the club announced that it would withdraw its reserve team at the end of the 2014–15 season after a rule change that allowed 3. Liga clubs to do so. SpVgg Unterhaching stated financial reasons for this step.

== Honours ==
The club's honours:

=== League ===
- Landesliga Bayern-Süd (V)
  - Runners-up: 2001
- Bezirksoberliga Oberbayern (VI)
  - Champions: 1999
- Bezirksliga Oberbayern-Ost (VI-VII)
  - Champions: 1996
  - Runners-up: 1992

=== Cup ===
- Oberbayern Cup
  - Winners: 2004

== Recent managers ==
Recent managers of the club:

Manager	Start	Finish
Marco Schmidt	1 July 2003	30 June 2004
Alfred Ruthe	1 July 2005	30 June 2010
Harry Deutinger	1 July 2010	30 June 2012
Florian Ernst	1 July 2012	4 January 2014
Alexander Schmalhofer	4 January 2014	30 June 2014

== Recent seasons ==
The recent season-by-season performance of the club:

Season	Division	Tier	Position
1999-2000	Landesliga Bayern-Süd	V	3rd
2000-01	Landesliga Bayern-Süd	V	2nd ↑
2001-02	Bayernliga	IV	6th
2002-03	Bayernliga	IV	8th
2003-04	Bayernliga	IV	5th
2004-05	Bayernliga	IV	7th
2005-06	Bayernliga	IV	10th
2006-07	Bayernliga	IV	13th
2007-08	Bayernliga	IV	9th ↑
2008-09	Regionalliga Süd	IV	18th ↓
2009-10	Bayernliga	V	3rd
2010–11	Bayernliga	V	7th
2011–12	Bayernliga	V	18th
2012–13	Bayernliga Süd	V	6th
2013–14	Bayernliga Süd	V	9th
2014–15	Bayernliga Süd	V	19th

- With the introduction of the Bezirksoberligas in 1988 as the new fifth tier, below the Landesligas, all leagues below dropped one tier. With the introduction of the Regionalligas in 1994 and the 3. Liga in 2008 as the new third tier, below the 2. Bundesliga, all leagues below dropped one tier. With the establishment of the Regionalliga Bayern as the new fourth tier in Bavaria in 2012 the Bayernliga was split into a northern and a southern division, the number of Landesligas expanded from three to five and the Bezirksoberligas abolished. All leagues from the Bezirksligas onward were elevated one tier.

↑ Promoted	↓ Relegated
