= TSV Buchbach =

German football club

- Full name: Turn- und Sportverein Buchbach e.V.
- Founded: 1913
- Ground: SMR-Arena
- Capacity: 3,000
- Chairman: Anton Maier
- Manager: Sven Zurawka
- League: Regionalliga Bayern (IV)
- 2025–26: Regionalliga Bayern, 11th of 18
Home colours	Away colours

TSV Buchbach is a German association football club from the village of Buchbach, Bavaria. The team is part of a larger sports club that also has departments for curling, gymnastics, skiing, and tennis. The football club formerly held the German record for the longest undefeated streak, 75 matches from 19 August 1995 to 23 May 1998.

== History ==
TSV was founded in 1913 as a gymnastics club. Football was soon introduced to the club by students who brought the game back from Munich. A football department was established within the association on 11 January 1930.

Following World War II, Buchbach played in local A-Class competition until slipping to B-Class play in 1960, where they remained until returning to the A-class in 1980. In the mid-1990s, with solid sponsorship in place, they began their record-making unbeaten run. They advanced to the Landesliga Süd (V) in 2004 and a title in 2008 saw TSV promoted to the Bayernliga (V).

At the end of the 2011–12 season the club finished in the top nine of the Bayernliga and directly qualified for the new tier-four Regionalliga Bayern. TS finished sixth, fifth and fourth in the first three seasons and they have remained in the league since.

== Honours ==
The club's honours:

=== League ===
- Landesliga Bayern-Süd (V)
  - Champions: 2008
- Bezirksoberliga Oberbayern (VI)
  - Champions: 2004
- Bezirksliga Oberbayern-Ost (VII)
  - Runners-up: 2001, 2003

== Players ==
As of 8 September 2026

Note: Flags indicate national team as defined under FIFA eligibility rules; some limited exceptions apply. Players may hold more than one non-FIFA nationality.

No.	Pos.	Nation	Player
1	GK	GER	Ludwig Zech
3	DF	GER	Marinus Erber
4	DF	GER	Leo Kainz
5	DF	GER	Rocco Tavra
6	DF	GER	Philipp Walter
7	MF	GER	Florian Wiedl
8	MF	GER	Samed Bahar
10	MF	GER	Tobias Heiland
11	FW	GER	Tobias Stoßberger
15	DF	ALB	Faton Xhemaili
16	MF	GER	Dominik Auerhammer
17	FW	GER	Andreas Hirtlreiter

No.	Pos.	Nation	Player
18	MF	GER	Josué Mbila
19	MF	GER	Philipp Zimmerer
20	MF	CRO	Romeo Ivelj
22	DF	GER	Tizian Zimmermann
23	MF	GER	Daniel Muteba
24	DF	GER	Fadhel Morou
27	MF	GER	Leo Haas
28	FW	GER	Tobias Sztaf
31	GK	GER	Oskar Preil
33	DF	GER	Alexander Mehring
34	FW	GER	Albano Gashi
37	DF	GER	Jonas Wieselsberger

== Recent managers ==
Recent managers of the club:

Manager	Start	Finish
Anton Bobenstetter	1 July 2001	30 June 2007
Matthias Pongratz	1 July 2008	30 June 2009
Helmut Wirth	1 July 2009	30 June 2010
Anton Bobenstetter	1 July 2010	30 June 2019
Andreas Bichlmaier	1 July 2019	14 March 2023
Uwe Wolf	14 March 2023	present

== Recent seasons ==
The recent season-by-season performance of the club:

Season	Division	Tier	Position
1999–2000	Bezirksliga Oberbayern-Ost	VII	9th
2000–01	Bezirksliga Oberbayern-Ost	VII	2nd
2001–02	Bezirksliga Oberbayern-Ost	VII	5th
2002–03	Bezirksliga Oberbayern-Ost	VII	2nd ↑
2003–04	Bezirksoberliga Oberbayern	VI	1st ↑
2004–05	Landesliga Bayern-Süd	V	12th
2005–06	Landesliga Bayern-Süd	V	6th
2006–07	Landesliga Bayern-Süd	V	5th
2007–08	Landesliga Bayern-Süd	V	1st ↑
2008–09	Bayernliga	V	8th
2009–10	Bayernliga	V	11th
2010–11	Bayernliga	V	4th
2011–12	Bayernliga	V	4th ↑
2012–13	Regionalliga Bayern	IV	6th
2013–14	Regionalliga Bayern	IV	5th
2014–15	Regionalliga Bayern	IV	4th
2015–16	Regionalliga Bayern	IV	8th
2016–17	Regionalliga Bayern	IV	13th
2017–18	Regionalliga Bayern	IV	12th
2018–19	Regionalliga Bayern	IV	8th
2019–21	Regionalliga Bayern	IV	7th
2021–22	Regionalliga Bayern	IV	12th
2022–23	Regionalliga Bayern	IV	12th
2023–24	Regionalliga Bayern	IV	16th
2024–25	Regionalliga Bayern	IV	2nd
2025–26	Regionalliga Bayern	IV	11th

- With the introduction of the Bezirksoberligas in 1988 as the new fifth tier, below the Landesligas, all leagues below dropped one tier. With the introduction of the Regionalligas in 1994 and the 3. Liga in 2008 as the new third tier, below the 2. Bundesliga, all leagues below dropped one tier. With the establishment of the Regionalliga Bayern as the new fourth tier in Bavaria in 2012 the Bayernliga was split into a northern and a southern division, the number of Landesligas expanded from three to five and the Bezirksoberligas abolished. All leagues from the Bezirksligas onwards were elevated one tier.

↑ Promoted	↓ Relegated

== Unbeaten record 1995 – 1998 ==
Following a 5–1 defeat on 14 June 1995 to FC Grünthal, which meant relegation to the C-Klasse, then the lowest league in Bavaria, the club started a record-breaking run of 75 unbeaten league games. In the 1995–96 season, it played 26 games in the C-Klasse Inn/Salzach – Group 4, coming first with 20 wins and six draws and earning promotion back to the B-Klasse.

The following season, the club again earned a league championship, now in the B-Klasse Inn/Salzach Group 3. In 26 games it achieved 18 wins and 8 draws. In 1997–98, the club remained undefeated in the first 23 of 26 league matches, before losing 3–1 at home to SV Waldhausen on 24 May 1998. Nevertheless, promotion was once more achieved. The record held until 2006 when it was taken by BSG Stahl Riesa with 78 consecutive league matches without a defeat.
