= Bezirksoberliga Oberbayern =

- Founded: 1988
- Folded: 2012
- Country: Germany
- State: Bavaria
- Level on pyramid: Level 7
- Promotion to: Landesliga Süd
- Relegation to: Bezirksliga Nord; Bezirksliga Ost; Bezirksliga Süd
- Last champions: SC Eintracht Freising (2011–12)

The Bezirksoberliga Oberbayern was the seventh tier of the German football league system in the Bavarian Regierungsbezirk of Upper Bavaria (German: Oberbayern). Until the introduction of the 3. Liga in 2008 it was the sixth tier of the league system, until the introduction of the Regionalligas in 1994 the fifth tier.

The league was disbanded at the end of the 2011–12 season, when major changes to the Bavarian football league system were carried out. Above the Bezirksoberligas, the Landesligas were expanded in number from three to five divisions and the Bezirke have two to three regional leagues, the Bezirksligas, as its highest level again, similar to the system in place until 1988.

== Overview ==
The Bezirksoberligas in Bavaria were introduced in 1988 to create a highest single-division playing level for each of the seven Regierungsbezirk. The term Bezirksoberliga translates roughly into County Premier League, a Regierungsbezirk being a similar administrative entity to a County.

Before the introduction of the Bezirksoberligas, the Bezirksliga was the level of play below the Landesliga. The Bezirksligas Oberbayern-Nord, Oberbayern-Süd and Oberbayern-Ost fed the Landesliga Bayern-Süd as they afterwards feed the Bezirksoberliga Oberbayern.

The winner of the Bezirksoberliga Oberbayern, like the winner of the Bezirksoberliga Schwaben, was directly promoted to the Landesliga Bayern-Süd. The two second placed teams out of those leagues played-off for another promotion spot. The winner went to Landesliga, the loser faced the 15th placed team out of the Landesliga for the last spot there. However, in some years additional promotion places were available in the Landesliga.

The three bottom teams of the Bezirksoberliga were relegated to the Bezirksliga, the team just above those faced a play-off against the second placed Bezirksliga teams.

Some of the clubs in the west of Oberbayern actually play in the Schwaben football league system. This is mostly because before the border reform in the 1970s some actually had belonged to Schwaben. Being geographically closer to Augsburg then Munich also makes a difference.

Oberbayern is the only one of the seven Bezirke to have three Bezirksligas. The reason for this is the fact that it is the most populous. The Bavarian FA actually regulates, how many Bezirksligas a Bezirk needs to have, based on the number of clubs in the region.

With the league reform at the end of the 2011–12 season, which includes an expansion of the number of Landesligas from three to five, the Bezirksoberligas were disbanded. Instead, the Bezirksligas took the place of the Bezirksoberligas below the Landesligas once more.

The clubs from the Bezirksoberliga joined the following leagues:

- Champions: Promotion round to the Bayernliga, winners to the Bayernliga, losers to the Landesliga.
- Teams placed 2nd to 6th: Directly qualified to the Landesliga.
- Teams placed 7th to 12th: Three additional Landesliga places to be determined in a play-off round with the Bezirksliga champions, losers enter Bezirksliga.
- Teams placed 13th to 16th: Directly relegated to Bezirksligas

== Top-three of the Bezirksoberliga ==
The top-three finishers in the league since its interception:

**Season**	**Champions**	**Runners-up**	**Third**
1988–89	**BSG Himolla Taufkirchen**	**MSV München**	ESV Freilassing
1989–90	**FSV München**	**ESV Freilassing**	VfR Neuburg
1990–91	**ESV Ingolstadt**	**1. FC Miesbach** ^{+}	TSV 1860 München II ^{+}
1991–92	**BSC Sendling**	FSV München	ESV Neuaubing
1992–93	**1. FC Miesbach**	**SC Fürstenfeldbruck**	TuS Geretsried
1993–94	**TSV Großhadern**	**TuS Geretsried** ^{+}	ASV Dachau ^{+}
1994–95	**ESV Freilassing**	**TSV 1860 München II**	ASV Dachau
1995–96	**FC Garmisch-Partenkirchen**	**FC Ismaning**	1. FC Traunstein
1996–97	**TSV Ampfing**	**FSV München** ^{+}	SpVgg Feldmoching ^{+}
1997–98	**SC Eintracht Freising**	**TuS Geretsried**	SpVgg Unterhaching II
1998–99	**SpVgg Unterhaching II**	**TSV München-Grünwald**	Falke Markt Schwaben
1999–2000	**TSV Ebersberg**	**Falke Markt Schwaben**	1. FC Traunstein
2000–01	**SV Gendorf–Burgkirchen**	**Wacker Burghausen II**	ESV Ingolstadt
2001–02	**BCF Wolfratshausen**	**SV Raisting**	ESV Ingolstadt
2002–03	**FT Starnberg 09**	**SV Heimstetten**	ESV Ingolstadt
2003–04	**TSV Buchbach**	**SC Fürstenfeldbruck II**	TSV Ampfing
2004–05	**TSV Großhadern**	**SK Srbija München**	FC Unterföhring
2005–06	**TSV München–Grünwald** ^{+}	**FC Ingolstadt 04 II** ^{+}	SV Pullach
2006–07	**SV Raisting**	**SB/DJK Rosenheim**	VfB Eichstätt
2007–08	**SV Pullach**	FC Unterföhring	VfB Eichstätt
2008–09	**VfB Eichstätt**	**TSV Eching**	SC Eintracht Freising
2009–10	**FC Unterföhring**	**FC Gerolfing**	SpVgg Feldmoching
2010–11	**TSV Eching**	**SV Kirchanschöring** ^{+}	VfR Garching ^{+}
2011–12	**SC Eintracht Freising**	**VfR Garching**	**SC Kirchheim**

- Promoted teams in **bold**.
- ^{+} Teams finished on equal points, decider needed to determine final position.

=== Multiple winners ===
Only two clubs have won the league more than once:

**Club**	**Wins**	**Years**
SC Eintracht Freising	2	1998, 2012
TSV Großhadern	2	1994, 2005

== League placings ==
The final placings in the league since its interception:

Club	S	89	90	91	92	93	94	95	96	97	98	99	00	01	02	03	04	05	06	07	08	09	10	11	12
TSV 1860 München II	5			3	10	4	4	2	L	B	R	R	R	R	B	B	B	R	R	R	R	R	R	R	R
FC Ismaning	2							4	2	L	L	L	L	B	B	B	B	B	B	B	B	B	B	B	B
SpVgg Unterhaching II	3									8	3	1	L	L	B	B	B	B	B	B	B	R	B	B	B
SV Heimstetten	5											7	9	6	4	2	L	L	L	B	B	L	L	B	B
TSV Buchbach	1																1	L	L	L	L	B	B	B	B
FC Ingolstadt 04 II ^{1}	2																	5	2	L	L	B	B	B	B
SB/DJK Rosenheim	11	5	10	5	16		14	15								11	6	13	6	2	L	L	L	L	B
SC Fürstenfeldbruck	4	L	12	4	6	2	L	L	L	L	L	L	L	L	L	B	B	B	B	B	L	L	L	L	L
Wacker Burghausen II	2												5	2	L	L	L	L	B	B	L	L	L	L	L
BCF Wolfratshausen	1														1	L	L	B	L	L	L	L	L	L	L
SV Pullach	10										10	9	4	12	13	4	16		3	4	1	L	L	L	L
VfB Eichstätt	3																			3	3	1	L	L	L
FC Unterföhring	6																	3	10	8	2	6	1	L	L
TSV Eching	4	L	L	B	B	B	L	L	L	L	L	L	L	L	L	L	L	L	8	15		2	L	1	L
SV Kirchanschöring	8															14		10	7	11	4	7	9	2	L
SC Eintracht Freising	6										1	L	L	L	L	L	L	L	L	L	7	3	11	8	1
VfR Garching	7				4	8	13	14															4	3	2
SC Kirchheim	2																							11	3
Falke Markt Schwaben	10				9	12	11	5	10	4	4	3	2	L	B	B	L	L	L	L	L	L	L	L	4
FT Starnberg 09 ^{2}	9	10	13												L	1	L	L	L	9	9	4	5	6	5
FC Deisenhofen	5								15													10	8	9	6
FC Gerolfing	2																						2	L	7
SV Manching	1																								8
TuS Holzkirchen	2																				13				9
SpVgg Feldmoching	14	4	16							3	7	15					7	7	12	7	11	5	3	10	10
SV Raisting	12							12	12	16			10	9	2	L	8	4	5	1	L	L	14		11
TSV Ampfing	8	B	L	L	L	L	L	L	L	1	L	L	L	L	L	9	3	11	15				7	4	12
ASV Dachau	19	9	4	8	11	10	3	3	9	14		10	16					12	9	5	10	12	10	7	13
1. FC Miesbach	11		6	2	L	1	L	L	L	L	L	L	L	L	15		10	8	11	10	12	15			14
TuS Geretsried	6					3	2	L	L	L	2	L	L	L	17									5	15
SC Baldham	7													4	5	12	13		14					12	16
SV Erlbach	5																			12	6	13	6	13	
Eintracht Karlsfeld	11		5	10	5	6	5	7	14												5	11	12	14	
TSV Großhadern	6	L	L	L	L	L	1	L	L	L	L	L	8	5	14			1	L	L	L	L	L	15	
BC Attaching	1																							16	
SC Olching	2																			13			13		
TSV Wasserburg	6					11	16												13		8	8	15		
TSV Kösching	2																					9	16		
1. FC Traunstein	16				7	13	9	11	3	10	11	11	3	7	9	10	12	6	16			14			
SC Gaißach	1																					16			
ESV Freilassing	9	3	2	L	8	5	8	1	L	6	15										14				
TSV München-Grünwald	13	L	L	L	L	9	10	9	6	13		2	L	8	6	6	5	9	1	L	15				
SK Srbija München	4																11	2	L	6	16				
SC Fürstenfeldbruck II	4															8	2	L	4	14					
FC Perach	1																			16					
TSV Ottobrunn	8	15					6	13	8	9	5	14						14							
Türk SV München ^{5}	3	B	B	B	B	L	L	B	B	L	L	L	L	L	L	13	9	15							
MTV Berg	1																	16							
SV Gendorf	4			16								6	7	1	L	L	L								
ESV Ingolstadt ^{1}	6	L	L	1	L	L	L	16						3	3	3	4								
FC Neufahrn	6										13		11	11	8	7	14								
FC Aschheim	2															5	15								
TSV Reischach	2														10	15									
SV Germering	6										6	5	13	10	11	16									
VfR Neuburg	7	7	3	6	12	18									7	17									
SV Lohhof	1	L	L	B	B	B	B	R	B	B	B	B	R	B	L	18									
TSV Ebersberg	4										8	8	1	L	12										
FC Sportfreunde Eiting	1														16										
VfL Waldkraiburg	1													13											
TSV Forstenried	1													14											
Gartenstadt Trudering	8					15		8	5	7	9	4	12	15											
TSV Marktl	2												6	16											
FC Emmering	8	8	7	7	14					5	12	12	15												
TSV Milbertshofen	1												14												
FC Garmisch	2								1	L	L	13													
SV Aubing	1											16													
FSV München ^{3}	6	L	1	L	2	7	15		4	2	L														
FC Moosining	7	6	9	14				10	11	11	14														
BSC Sendling	4				1	L	17			12	16														
Himolla Taufkirchen	3	1	L	L	L	L	L	L	7	15															
FSV Pfaffenhofen	1								13																
FC Croatia München	3						7	6	16																
TSV Trudering	1						12																		
FC Wacker München	1	B	L	L	L	14																			
SV Odelzhausen	1					16																			
ESV Neuabing	3			9	3	17																			
FC Penzberg	4	11	8	11	13																				
MSV München	3	2	L	12	15																				
SV Kranzberg	1			13																					
TSV Bad Endorf	2		11	15																					
TuS Raubling	2	12	14																						
SV Planegg-Krailling	1		15																						
TSV Allach	1	13																							
FC Schrobenhausen ^{3}	1	14																							
SV Waldhausen	1	16																							

=== Key ===
Color	Key
R	Regionalliga Süd
B	Bayernliga
L	Landesliga Süd
1, 2, 3, ...	Bezirksoberliga
1	League champions
	Played at a league level below this league

- S = No of seasons in league (as of 2011-12)

=== Notes ===
- ^{1} Formed in a merger of MTV Ingolstadt and ESV Ingolstadt in 2004, FC Ingolstadt II took up the league place of the later.
- ^{2} The football departments of FT Starnberg 09 merged with SpVgg Starnberg to form FC Starnberg in 1992. In 2001, the FC Starnberg was dissolved and the football department re-joined FT Starnberg 09.
- ^{3} FC Schrobenhausen also played one season (2007-08) in the Bezirksoberliga Schwaben.
- ^{4} The FSV München folded in 1999.
- ^{5} Türk Gücü München folded in 2001 and reformed as Türkischer SV 1975 München. In 2009, the club merged with SV Ataspor to form SV Türkgücü-Ataspor München.

== All-time table ==
As of 2011, the ASV Dachau leads the all-time table of this league, 74 points ahead of the 1. FC Traunstein, third placed is the TSV München-Grünwald. The SV Aubing holds the 83rd and last place with 11 points. For the 2011–12 season, only one club will be joining the league that has never done so before, the SV Manching.
