= FC Ingolstadt 04 II =

German football club

- Full name: Fußball-Club Ingolstadt 04 e. V.
- Founded: 2004
- Ground: ESV-Stadion
- Capacity: 11,418
- Manager: Patrick Schönfeld
- League: Bayernliga Nord (V)
- 2025–26: Bayernliga Nord, 7th of 18
Home colours	Away colours

The FC Ingolstadt 04 II is a German association football club from the city of Ingolstadt, Bavaria. It is the reserve team of FC Ingolstadt.

== History ==
FC Ingolstadt 04 was formed in 2004 through a merger of two local rivals, MTV Ingolstadt and ESV Ingolstadt, with the former playing in the Landesliga Bayern-Süd while the later played in the Bezirksoberliga Oberbayern at the time. The first team took MTV's place, having just been promoted to the Bayernliga, while the new reserve side took up ESV's place in the Bezirksoberliga.

The team took two seasons in this league to achieve success, winning promotion to the Landesliga in 2005. In the Landesliga, the side took again two years to move up again, to the Bayernliga, while the first team had begun its climb through the Regionalliga that would eventually culminate in the 2nd Bundesliga. After three seasons in the Bayernliga, the side finished runners-up in the league in 2010–11 and, courtesy to champions FC Ismaning declining promotion, was promoted to the Regionalliga for the following season.

The team became part of the new Regionalliga Bayern in 2012 and played at this level until 2019, finishing fifth in 2014–15.

== Honours ==
The club's honours:

=== League ===
- Bayernliga (IV)
  - Runners-up: 2011
- Landesliga Bayern-Süd (V)
  - Runners-up: 2008
- Bezirksoberliga Oberbayern (VI)
  - Runners-up: 2006

== Recent managers ==
The teams recent managers were:

Manager	Start	Finish
Michael Wiesinger	1 July 2008	22 April 2009
Josef Albersinger	1 July 2009	30 June 2013
Tomislav Stipic	1 July 2013	9 September 2014
Stefan Leitl	15 September 2014	Present

== Recent seasons ==
The season-by-season performance of the team:

Season	Division	Tier	Position
2004–05	Bezirksoberliga Oberbayern	VI	5th
2005–06	Bezirksoberliga Oberbayern	VI	2nd ↑
2006–07	Landesliga Bayern-Süd	V	6th
2007–08	Landesliga Bayern-Süd	V	2nd ↑
2008–09	Bayernliga	V	6th
2009–10	Bayernliga	V	6th
2010–11	Bayernliga	V	2nd ↑
2011–12	Regionalliga Süd	IV	9th
2012–13	Regionalliga Bayern	IV	8th
2013–14	Regionalliga Bayern	IV	6th
2014–15	Regionalliga Bayern	IV	5th
2015–16	Regionalliga Bayern	IV	11th
2016–17	Regionalliga Bayern	IV	

- With the introduction of the Bezirksoberligas in 1988 as the new fifth tier, below the Landesligas, all leagues below dropped one tier. With the introduction of the Regionalligas in 1994 and the 3. Liga in 2008 as the new third tier, below the 2. Bundesliga, all leagues below dropped one tier. With the establishment of the Regionalliga Bayern as the new fourth tier in Bavaria in 2012 the Bayernliga was split into a northern and a southern division, the number of Landesligas expanded from three to five and the Bezirksoberligas abolished. All leagues from the Bezirksligas onward were elevated one tier.

↑ Promoted	↓ Relegated

== Current squad ==
As of 24 February 2023

Note: Flags indicate national team as defined under FIFA eligibility rules; some limited exceptions apply. Players may hold more than one non-FIFA nationality.

No.	Pos.	Nation	Player
1	GK	GER	Ludwig Zech
3	DF	AUT	Stefan Inthal
4	DF	GER	Donald Nduka
6	MF	GER	Felix Keidel
7	FW	GER	Valdrin Konjuhi
8	FW	SLE	Mussa Fofanah
10	MF	GER	Ishak Karaogul
11	MF	KOS	Edison Mazreku
12	GK	GER	Leopold Leimeister
14	DF	GER	Jonas Perconti
16	MF	GER	Tim Herm
17	FW	CRO	Renato Domislić
19	MF	GER	Leon Nuhanovic
20	MF	GER	Simon Kampmann
21	FW	GER	Michael Senger

No.	Pos.	Nation	Player
22	GK	GER	Maurice Dehler
23	MF	GER	Mario Götzendörfer
24	FW	HKG	Michael Udebuluzor
27	FW	CZE	Fabio Riedl
42	FW	GER	Jeroen Kupra
—	MF	MDA	Damian Jarcutchi
—	FW	GER	Paul Kalischko
