= FC Unterföhring =

- Full name: Fussball Club Unterföhring 1927 e.V.
- Nickname: FC Unterfoehring FCU
- Founded: 6 March 1927
- Ground: Sportpark Isarau
- Capacity: The Village
- Chairman: Faber Franz
- Manager: Zlatan Simikic
- League: Bayernliga Süd (V)
- 2017–18: Regionalliga Bayern (IV), 19th (relegated)
Home colours	Away colours

The FC Unterföhring is a German association football club from the town of Unterföhring, Bavaria.

The club's greatest success came in 2017 when it qualified for the Regionalliga Bayern, the fourth tier of the German football league system.

== History ==
FC Unterföhring was formed on 6 March 1927.

For most of its history the club has been a non-descript amateur side in local Bavarian football. The club rose to the highest level of football in Upper Bavaria for the first time in 2004, when it won promotion to the tier six Bezirksoberliga Oberbayern by winning the Bezirksliga Oberbayern-Nord. Unterföhring spend the next six seasons in this league, generally achieving good results. In 2009–10 the club was able to win the league and earn promotion to the Landesliga Bayern-Süd.

In the Landesliga Unterföhring achieved an excellent fourth place in its first season there but came only 12th in 2011–12, the last season of the league's existence. This finish was however enough to advance to the promotion round to the expanded Bayernliga. The club managed to defeat TSV Bad Abbach and FC Ergolding in the knock-out rounds and earned the right to compete in the Bayernliga for the first time in 2012–13.

In the new league Unterföhring finished seventh in its first season there and tenth the season after.

The club finished second in the 2016–17 season and was promoted to the Regionalliga Bayern after champions, SV Pullach, were declined promotion. However, it finished in last place in its first season in the Regionalliga and was relegated straight back to the Bayernliga.

== Current squad ==
As of 22 February 2021

Note: Flags indicate national team as defined under FIFA eligibility rules; some limited exceptions apply. Players may hold more than one non-FIFA nationality.

No.	Pos.	Nation	Player
1	GK	GER	Marko Negic
3	DF	JPN	Taiki Fujita
4	FW	GER	Matthias Katerna
6	DF	CRO	Luka Coporda
7	DF	GER	Moritz Wolf-Weisbrod
9	FW	GER	Simon Kürbs
10	MF	GER	Tayfun Arkadas
11	MF	CRO	Nikola Negic
12	MF	AFG	Nasrullah Mirza
13	DF	GER	Moritz Erbs
14	DF	GER	Janosch Bárhó
15	DF	GER	Pascal Putta
16	DF	GRE	Nikolaos Mangasaros

No.	Pos.	Nation	Player
18	MF	CRO	Marko Tomicic
19	MF	GER	Ajlan Arifovic
20	DF	PHI	Patrick Hinrichsen
21	FW	FRA	Lassana Boubacar
22	MF	GER	David Küttner
23	GK	GER	Daniel Shorunkeh-Sawyerr
25	MF	GER	Vincent Heller
26	FW	GER	Andreas Faber (captain)
29	MF	GER	Michael Marinkovic
30	DF	GER	Michael Eder
31	DF	GER	Georg Hertl
—	GK	BIH	Andrej Popravak
—	DF	GER	Janosch Bárhó

== Honours ==
The club's honours:

- Bayernliga Süd
  - Runners-up: 2017
- Landesliga Bayern-Südost
  - Runners-up: 2022
- Bezirksoberliga Oberbayern
  - Champions: 2010
  - Runners-up: 2008
- Bezirksliga Oberbayern-Nord
  - Champions: 2004

== Recent seasons ==
The recent season-by-season performance of the club:

Season	Division	Tier	Position
2003–04	Bezirksliga Oberbayern-Nord	VII	1st ↑
2004–05	Bezirksoberliga Oberbayern	VI	3rd
2005–06	Bezirksoberliga Oberbayern	VI	10th
2006–07	Bezirksoberliga Oberbayern	VI	8th
2007–08	Bezirksoberliga Oberbayern	VI	2nd
2008–09	Bezirksoberliga Oberbayern	VII	6th
2009–10	Bezirksoberliga Oberbayern	VII	1st ↑
2010–11	Landesliga Bayern-Süd	VI	4th
2011–12	Landesliga Bayern-Süd	VI	12th ↑
2012–13	Bayernliga Süd	V	7th
2013–14	Bayernliga Süd	V	10th
2014–15	Bayernliga Süd	V	9th
2015–16	Bayernliga Süd	V	5th
2016–17	Bayernliga Süd	V	2nd ↑
2017–18	Regionalliga Bayern	IV	19th ↓
2018-19	Bayernliga Süd	V	16th ↓
2020-21	Landesliga Bayern-Südost	VI	10th
2021-22	Landesliga Bayern-Südost	VI	2nd
2022-23	Landesliga Bayern-Südost	VI	8th
2023-24	Landesliga Bayern-Südost	VI	11th
2024-25	Landesliga Bayern-Südost	VI	7th
2025-26	Landesliga Bayern-Südost	VI	13th

- With the introduction of the Bezirksoberligas in 1988 as the new fifth tier, below the Landesligas, all leagues below dropped one tier. With the introduction of the Regionalligas in 1994 and the 3. Liga in 2008 as the new third tier, below the 2. Bundesliga, all leagues below dropped one tier. With the establishment of the Regionalliga Bayern as the new fourth tier in Bavaria in 2012 the Bayernliga was split into a northern and a southern division, the number of Landesligas expanded from three to five and the Bezirksoberligas abolished. All leagues from the Bezirksligas onward were elevated one tier.

↑ Promoted	↓ Relegated
