= SV Wacker Burghausen II =

- Full name: Sportverein Wacker Burghausen
- Founded: 1930
- Ground: Wacker-Arena
- Capacity: 10,000
- League: Defunct
- 2013–14: Bayernliga Süd (V), 15th (withdrawn)

The SV Wacker Burghausen II was a German association football club from Burghausen, Bavaria. It was the reserve team of SV Wacker Burghausen.

The team's greatest successes came in 2005 and 2012 when it qualified on both occasions for the Bayernliga, the fifth tier of the German football league system, where it played until 2014 when the club decided to withdraw the team from competition at the end of the season.

== History ==
The team, for most part of its history, was just the reserve side of an amateur team and its rise began when the senior side began to rise through the ranks of Bavarian football. Wacker's first team earned promotion to the Bayernliga for the first time in 1993, followed by promotion to the Regionalliga. With the senior team going as far as the 2. Bundesliga from 2002 to 2007 the reserve team began to rise, too, winning promotion to the Bezirksliga Oberbayern-Ost in 1998.

Wacker II stayed for only one season in the Bezirksliga, finishing second in 1998–99 and earning promotion to the Bezirksoberliga Oberbayern. This league, too, became only a transitional stage for the side, achieving another runners-up finish and promotion in 2000–01. The team now entered the Landesliga Bayern-Süd, where it spent the next four seasons, improving every year and eventually winning the league in 2004–05. The seniors team's rise to professional football in 2002 meant for the reserve side a name change to SV Wacker Burghausen Amateure, but this was reverted in 2005 when all reserve sides of Bundesliga and 2. Bundesliga teams moved to a Roman numeral system for identification.

The team spent two seasons in the Bayernliga, but was not able to perform as well there as in its previous years, being relegated again in 2006–07, the same year the senior team was relegated from the 2. Bundesliga. Wacker II had three reasonable seasons in the Landesliga after that but came only 15th in 2010–11 and very close to relegation. The following year the team improved dramatically, taking out the last league title in the Landesliga Süd before it was disbanded. On paper this would have qualified the team to take part in the promotion round to the new Regionalliga Bayern but, as the reserve team of a 3. Liga side, it was not allowed to enter Regionalliga football and therefore moved up into the new southern division of the Bayernliga instead.

The side performed well at this level, too, finishing second but once more not being able to take part in the promotion round to the Regionalliga because of the senior teams 3. Liga status.

At the end of the 2013–14 season, in which the team finished 15th in the Bayernliga, the club announced it would withdraw its reserve side from competition altogether.

== Honours ==
The club's honours:

- Bayernliga-Süd (V)
  - Runners-up: 2013
- Landesliga Bayern-Süd (V)
  - Champions: 2005, 2012
- Bezirksoberliga Oberbayern (VI)
  - Runners-up: 2001
- Bezirksliga Oberbayern-Ost (VII)
  - Runners-up: 1999

== Recent managers ==
Recent managers of the club:

Manager	Start	Finish
Mario Demmelbauer	1 July 2009	30 June 2013
Christian Wimmer	1 July 2013	13 September 2013
Günter Heberle	13 September 2013	17 February 2014
Stanley König	17 February 2014	30 June 2014

== Recent seasons ==
The recent season-by-season performance of the club:

Year	Division	Tier	Position
1999–2000	Bezirksoberliga Oberbayern	VI	5th
2000–01	Bezirksoberliga Oberbayern	VI	2nd ↑
2001–02	Landesliga Bayern-Süd	V	13th
2002–03	Landesliga Bayern-Süd	V	10th
2003–04	Landesliga Bayern-Süd	V	3rd
2004–05	Landesliga Bayern-Süd	V	1st ↑
2005–06	Bayernliga	IV	13th
2006–07	Bayernliga	IV	18th ↓
2007–08	Landesliga Bayern-Süd	V	6th
2008–09	Landesliga Bayern-Süd	VI	5th
2009–10	Landesliga Bayern-Süd	VI	6th
2010-11	Landesliga Bayern-Süd	VI	15th
2011–12	Landesliga Bayern-Süd	VI	1st ↑
2012–13	Bayernliga-Süd	V	2nd
2013–14	Bayernliga Süd	V	15th (withdrawn)

- With the introduction of the Bezirksoberligas in 1988 as the new fifth tier, below the Landesligas, all leagues below dropped one tier. With the introduction of the Regionalligas in 1994 and the 3. Liga in 2008 as the new third tier, below the 2. Bundesliga, all leagues below dropped one tier. With the establishment of the Regionalliga Bayern as the new fourth tier in Bavaria in 2012 the Bayernliga was split into a northern and a southern division, the number of Landesligas expanded from three to five and the Bezirksoberligas abolished. All leagues from the Bezirksligas onwards were elevated one tier.

=== Key ===
↑ Promoted	↓ Relegated
