= SV Heimstetten =

Association football club

- Full name: Sportverein Heimstetten e. V.
- Founded: 1967
- Ground: Sportpark Heimstetten
- Capacity: 2,800
- Chairman: Ewald J. Matejka
- Manager: Christoph Schmitt
- League: Bayernliga Süd (V)
- 2025–26: Bayernliga Süd, 7th of 17
Home colours	Away colours

SV Heimstetten is a German association football club based in Kirchheim in the district of Munich, Bavaria.

== History ==
The club was founded in 1967 and in addition to a football team has departments for basketball, gymnastics, Judo, table tennis, tennis, and volleyball.

The footballers played in lower-tier competition until winning promotion to the Bezirksliga (VII) in 1993 and the Bezirksoberliga Oberbayern (VI) in 1998. The club continued its steady rise with an advance to the Landesliga Bayern-Süd (V) in 2003, followed by a 2006 promotion to the Oberliga Bayern (IV) where they played until 2008, when a 17th-place finish meant relegation for the club.

After another Landesliga title in 2010, the club moved up to the Bayernliga once more. At the end of the 2011–12 season the club managed to qualify for the promotion round to the new Regionalliga Bayern, the lowest placed club in the league to do so, and advanced to the second round after defeating SpVgg Landshut in a penalty shoot-out. In this round the club managed to defeat Würzburger FV on away goals and thereby advanced to the new Regionalliga, the only Bayernliga team to do so through the play-offs. The club finished an outstanding fifth in the new league in 2013 but struggled against relegation all season the following year, eventually finishing 14th and surviving in the league for another season. The 2014–15 season saw the club finish fifteenth and having to enter the relegation round against the Bayernliga runners-up. The club lost against FC Amberg and were relegated. They returned to the Regionalliga in 2018.

The club is affiliated with the Deutschland Fußball Canadian Academy, based at Heimstetten. It also had reserve team goal keeper Ngemba Evans Obi called up for the Nigeria national football team in 2008.

== Honours ==
=== League ===
- Bayernliga Süd (V)
  - Champions: 2018
- Landesliga Bayern-Süd (V/VI)
  - Champions: (2) 2006, 2010
- Bezirksoberliga Oberbayern (VI)
  - Runners-up: 2003
- Bezirksliga Oberbayern-Ost (VI)
  - Champions: 1998
  - Runners-up: 1997

== Recent managers ==
Recent managers of the club:

Manager	Start	Finish
Manfred Rauscher	1 July 2002	30 June 2003
Frank Schmöller	1 July 2002	1 April 2008
(Croatia) Vitomir Moskovic	2 April 2008	30 June 2010
Claus Schromm	1 July 2010	28 October 2011
Rainer Elfinger	28 October 2011	19 August 2014
(Croatia) Vitomir Moskovic	20 August 2014	30 June 2015
Heiko Baumgärtner	1 July 2015	Present

== Recent seasons ==
The recent season-by-season performance of the club:

Season	Division	Tier	Position
1999–2000	Bezirksoberliga Oberbayern	VI	9th
2000–01	Bezirksoberliga Oberbayern	VI	6th
2001–02	Bezirksoberliga Oberbayern	VI	4th
2002–03	Bezirksoberliga Oberbayern	VI	2nd ↑
2003–04	Landesliga Bayern-Süd	V	7th
2004–05	Landesliga Bayern-Süd	V	4th
2005–06	Landesliga Bayern-Süd	V	1st ↑
2006–07	Bayernliga	IV	10th
2007–08	Bayernliga	IV	17th ↓
2008–09	Landesliga Bayern-Süd	VI	10th
2009–10	Landesliga Bayern-Süd	VI	1st ↑
2010–11	Bayernliga	V	14th
2011–12	Bayernliga	V	15th ↑
2012–13	Regionalliga Bayern	IV	5th
2013–14	Regionalliga Bayern	IV	14th
2014–15	Regionalliga Bayern	IV	15th ↓
2015–16	Bayernliga Süd	V	6th
2016–17	Bayernliga Süd	V	7th
2017–18	Bayernliga Süd	V	1st ↑
2018–19	Regionalliga Bayern	IV	16th
2019–21	Regionalliga Bayern	IV	14th
2021–22	Regionalliga Bayern	IV	14th

- With the introduction of the Bezirksoberligas in 1988 as the new fifth tier, below the Landesligas, all leagues below dropped one tier. With the introduction of the Regionalligas in 1994 and the 3. Liga in 2008 as the new third tier, below the 2. Bundesliga, all leagues below dropped one tier. With the establishment of the Regionalliga Bayern as the new fourth tier in Bavaria in 2012 the Bayernliga was split into a northern and a southern division, the number of Landesligas expanded from three to five and the Bezirksoberligas abolished. All leagues from the Bezirksligas onwards were elevated one tier.

↑ Promoted	↓ Relegated

== Stadium ==
Prior to 2001, SV Heimstetten played their home fixtures in the Sportgelände Gruber Straße. Today the team plays in the Sportpark Heimstetten, which has a capacity of 2,800 (190 seats).
