= SC Fürstenfeldbruck =

German football club

- Full name: Sportclub Fürstenfeldbruck von 1919 e.V.
- Founded: 1919
- Ground: Stadion an der Klosterstraße
- Capacity: 5,000
- Chairman: Marlon Cecic
- Manager: Michael Westermair
- League: Bezirksliga Oberbayern-Süd (VII)
- 2015–16: Landesliga Bayern-Südwest (VI), 15th (relegated)
Home colours	Away colours

SC Fürstenfeldbruck is a German association football club from Fürstenfeldbruck, Bavaria.

== History ==
The club was established in 1919 as Fußball Club Fürstenfeldbruck. The team is part of a sports club which, apart from football, also offers its members badminton and table tennis.

SCF did not make an impact on the Bavarian football scene until 1970, when it earned promotion to the Landesliga Bayern-Süd (IV). It took out a championship in this league in its first season there and advanced to the Amateurliga Bayern (III). The next six seasons, the team played at this level, with a fifth place in 1972 as its best performance. After relegation in 1976, the club spent three season trying to regain its Bayernliga status, finishing second in the first two attempts before winning the Landesliga in 1980.

In 1981 the club made its only appearance in DFB-Pokal (German Cup), going out in the opening round. It also achieved its best-ever league result in 1980–81, finishing third. Success was short-lived and the year after, the team was relegated once more. Returning to the Bayernliga in 1985, the club spent another three seasons at this level. Its 1987–88 performances ranks as one of the worst in the league, earning eight points out of 32 games, finishing last and returning to the Landesliga.

The club was handed down to the Bezirksoberliga Oberbayern the year after and took four seasons to recover from this drop. Back in the Landesliga from 1993 onwards, it spent another nine seasons before regaining its Bayernliga status. They regularly earned upper table results there until 2007 when a poor 17th-place finish saw the club sent down to the Landesliga Bayern-Süd (V).

At the end of the 2011–12 season the club qualified for the promotion round to the newly expanded Bayernliga and managed to return to this level after victories over SC Eintracht Freising and SV Pullach. In this league the club lasted for only one season before suffering relegation back to the Landesliga. Another relegation followed in 2015–16, now to the Bezirksliga.

== Honours ==
=== League ===
- Landesliga Bayern-Süd
  - Champions: (4) 1971, 1980, 1985, 2002
  - Runners-up: (2) 1978, 1979
- Bezirksoberliga Oberbayern
  - Runners-up: 1993, 2004^{‡}
- Bezirksliga Oberbayern-Nord
  - Champions: 1970
- Bezirksliga Oberbayern-Süd
  - Champions: 2003^{‡}

=== Indoor ===
- Bavarian indoor championship
  - Winners: (2) 1984, 1999

- ^{‡} Reserve team

== Recent managers ==
Recent managers of the club:

Manager	Start	Finish
Dirk Teschke	1 July 2006	30 June 2007
Rainer Ulrich		
Thomas Holz		
Dirk Teschke		22 January 2011
Roberto Fontana	26 January 2011	2013
Sasa Miskovic	2013	28 May 2013
Tarik Sarisakal	28 May 2013	2016
Michael Westermair	2016	present

== Recent seasons ==
The recent season-by-season performance of the club:

=== SC Fürstenfeldbruck ===
Season	Division	Tier	Position
1999–2000	Landesliga Bayern-Süd	V	10th
2000–01	Landesliga Bayern-Süd	V	8th
2001–02	Landesliga Bayern-Süd	V	1st ↑
2002–03	Bayernliga	IV	5th
2003–04	Bayernliga	IV	6th
2004–05	Bayernliga	IV	5th
2005–06	Bayernliga	IV	9th
2006–07	Bayernliga	IV	17th ↓
2007–08	Landesliga Bayern-Süd	V	5th
2008–09	Landesliga Bayern-Süd	VI	11th
2009–10	Landesliga Bayern-Süd	VI	7th
2010–11	Landesliga Bayern-Süd	VI	8th
2011–12	Landesliga Bayern-Süd	VI	9th ↑
2012–13	Bayernliga Süd	V	19th ↓
2013–14	Landesliga Bayern-Südwest	VI	7th
2014–15	Landesliga Bayern-Südwest	VI	11th
2015–16	Landesliga Bayern-Südwest	VI	15th ↓
2016–17	Bezirksliga Oberbayern-Süd	VII	

=== SC Fürstenfeldbruck II ===
Season	Division	Tier	Position
1999–2000	Bezirksliga Oberbayern-Süd	VII	3rd
2000–01	Bezirksliga Oberbayern-Süd	VII	3rd
2001–02	Bezirksliga Oberbayern-Süd	VII	1st ↑
2002–03	Bezirksoberliga Oberbayern	VI	8th
2003–04	Bezirksoberliga Oberbayern	VI	2nd ↑
2004–05	Landesliga Bayern-Süd	V	18th ↓
2005–06	Bezirksoberliga Oberbayern	VI	4th
2006–07	Bezirksoberliga Oberbayern	VI	14th ↓
2007–08	Bezirksliga Oberbayern-Süd	VII	7th
2008–09	Bezirksliga Oberbayern-Süd	VIII	10th
2009–10	Bezirksliga Oberbayern-Süd	VIII	13th
2010–11	Bezirksliga Oberbayern-Süd	VIII	6th
2011–12	Bezirksliga Oberbayern-Süd	VIII	16th ↓
2012–13	Kreisliga Zugspitze 2	VIII	13th ↓
2013–14	Kreisklasse Zugspitze 1	IX	13th ↓
2014–Present	inactive		

- With the introduction of the Bezirksoberligas in 1988 as the new fifth tier, below the Landesligas, all leagues below dropped one tier. With the introduction of the Regionalligas in 1994 and the 3. Liga in 2008 as the new third tier, below the 2. Bundesliga, all leagues below dropped one tier. With the establishment of the Regionalliga Bayern as the new fourth tier in Bavaria in 2012 the Bayernliga was split into a northern and a southern division, the number of Landesligas expanded from three to five and the Bezirksoberligas abolished. All leagues from the Bezirksligas onwards were elevated one tier.

↑ Promoted	↓ Relegated

== DFB Cup appearances ==
The club has qualified for the first round of the German Cup just once:

Season	Round	Date	Home	Away	Result	Attendance
DFB Cup 1980–81	First round	30 August 1980	Eintracht Braunschweig	SC Fürstenfeldbruck	4–1	
