= Regionalliga Bayern =

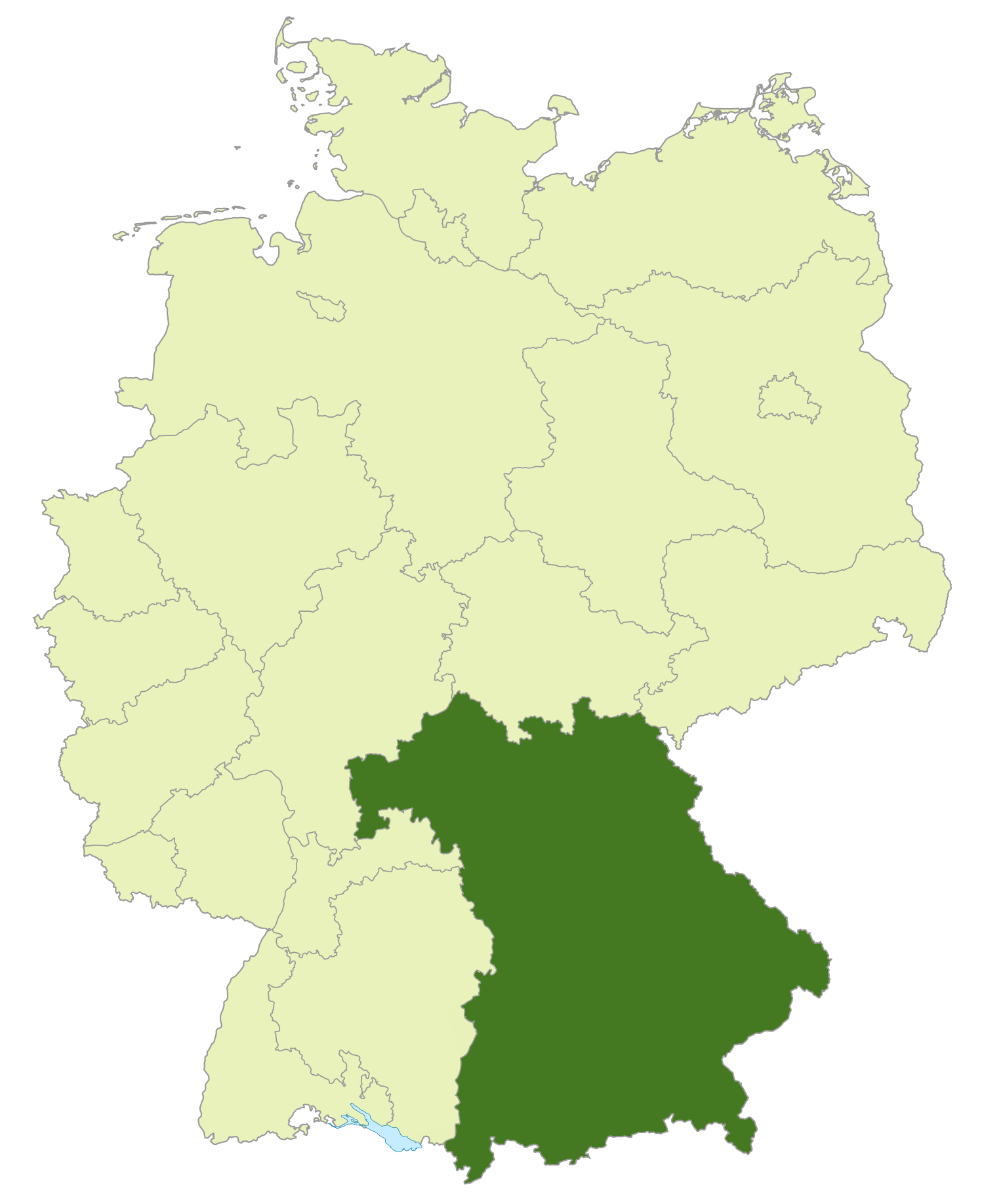
- Organising body: Bavarian Football Association
- Founded: 2012
- Country: Germany
- State: Bavaria
- Number of clubs: 18
- Level on pyramid: 4
- Promotion to: 3. Liga
- Relegation to: Bayernliga Nord; Bayernliga Süd
- Domestic cups: Bavarian Cup; DFB-Pokal
- Current champions: 1. FC Nürnberg II; (2025–26)
- Current: 2026–27 Regionalliga Bayern

The Regionalliga Bayern (English: Regional league Bavaria) is the highest association football league in the state of Bavaria (German: Bayern) and the Bavarian football league system. It is one of five Regionalligas in German football, the fourth tier of the German football league system, below the 3. Liga.

The league was established at the end of the 2011–12 season and replaced the Regionalliga Süd at this level in Bavaria.

== History ==
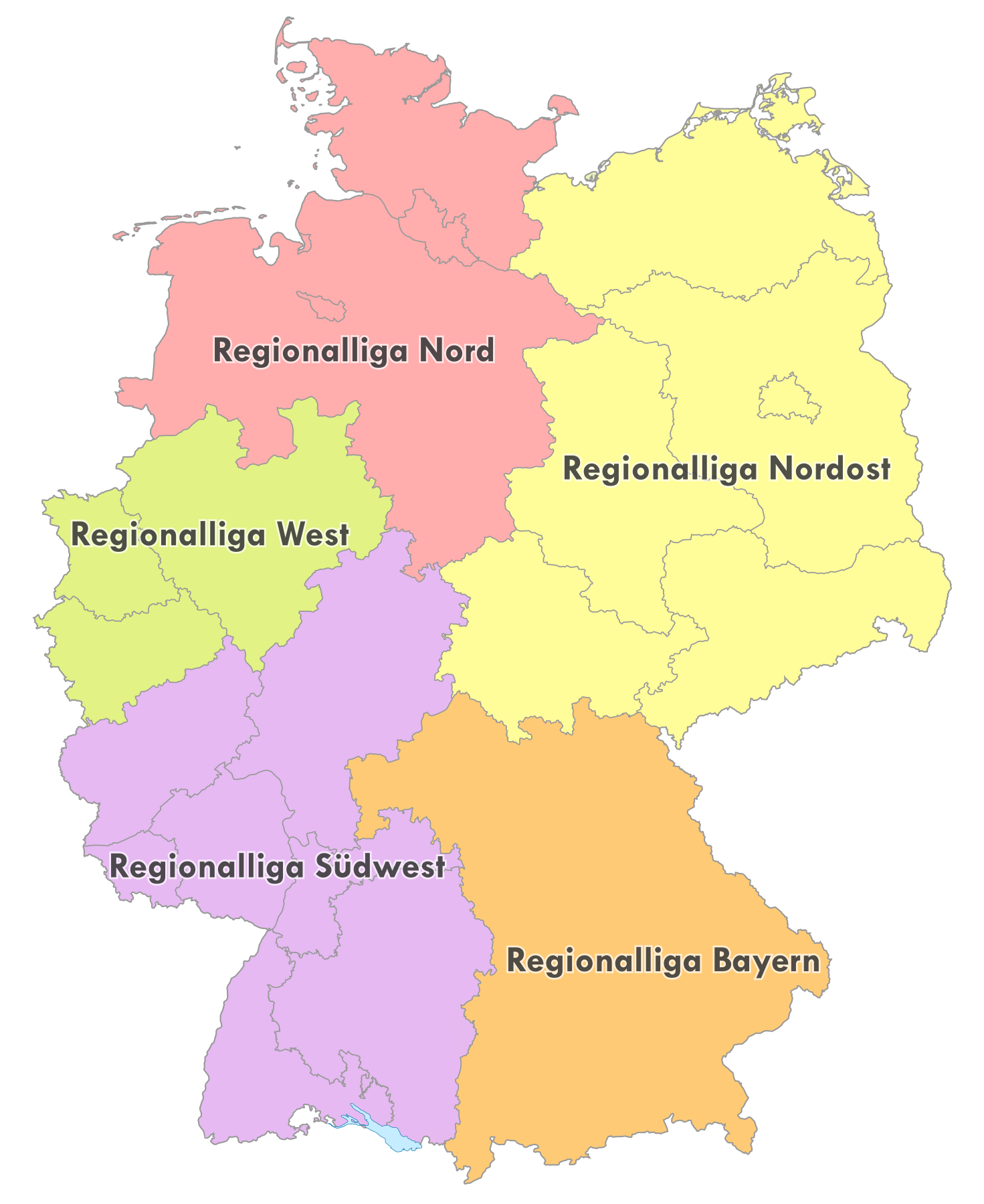
The Regionalligas from 2012 onwards.

The German league system, having gone through its last adjustment in 2008, when the 3. Liga was established and the number of Regionalligas increased from two to three, required another adjustment in 2011. The reason for this was the large number of insolvencies on the fourth level, caused by high cost and infrastructure requirements while, at the same time, the clubs at this level complained about low incomes and little interest from TV broadcasters. Some Regionalliga requirements were seen as causing too much of a financial strain on amateur clubs, for example stadiums had to have at least 1,000 seats, and a separate stand with separate entrance for away spectators. Many clubs also struggled to cope with the 400-pages long license application, having to rely on volunteers rather than being able draw on permanent staff.

This led to Oberliga champions even, at times, declining their right for promotion to avoid the financial risk the Regionalliga meant to them, breaking with a basic principle of German football that league champions would almost always be promoted.

In a special conference of the German Football Association, the DFB, in October 2010, 223 of 253 delegates voted for a reform of the league system on the fourth level. The number of Regionalligas was to be expanded to five, with the reestablishment of the Regionalliga Nordost, the formation of the Regionalliga Bayern and a shift of the Regionalliga Süd to the new Regionalliga Südwest.

The suggestion for the league reform had come from Bavaria, where, in a meeting of the Bavarian top-level amateur clubs at Wendelstein, the financial survival of the leagues and clubs in the current system was questioned. It resulted in the publication of what was called the Wendelsteiner Anstoß, which demanded a clear demarcation between professional football on the first three tiers of German football and amateur football below that. For this purpose, the paper also demanded the reestablishment of the German amateur football championship as an incentive and goal for top amateur clubs who did not want to turn professional.

On 16 December 2011, the Bavarian Football Association (German abbreviation: BFV) introduced the league's logo.

In March 2012 the BFV announced that the league champions, apart from having the opportunity to compete in the promotion round to the 3. Liga, would also qualify directly for the first round of the German Cup. Due to the ban of reserve teams in the German Cup, this spot would be handed to the best placed first team should the champions be a reserve side.

With the deadline for the licence applications for the new league set for 1 April 2012, 32 clubs had applied for the new league. Of those, one came from the 3. Liga, six from the Regionalliga, eight from the Landesliga and two from leagues outside Bavaria. Of the 18 Bayernliga clubs, 15 applied for a licence, with only TSV Gersthofen, TSV Aindling and SpVgg Unterhaching II deciding not to apply. Of the Landesliga clubs, eight applied for a licence.

The BFV planned to complete the licensing procedure by 20 April 2012 and notify all clubs of the outcome by that date, but this process was delayed. On 20 April 2012 the FSV Erlangen-Bruck opted to withdraw its Regionalliga application because of ongoing financial issues. All Bayernliga and Regionalliga clubs had their licence applications approved by 27 April 2012 while the Landesliga clubs had to wait another week before being notified of a decision.

The 2019–20 season was interrupted by the coronavirus disease pandemic in Germany that broke out in March 2020. It was later suspended until 31 August, necessitating a cancellation of the 2020–21 season as the BFV approved a resumption of the preceding one with 17 teams after 1 September and its extension to mid-2021.

== League statistics ==
The top goal scorers and spectator statistics for the league are:

Season	Teams	Champions	Runners-up	Overall Spectators	Per game	Best supported Club	Spectators per game	Top goal scorer	Goals	References
2012–13	20	1860 Munich II	Bayern Munich II	222,885	587	TSV Buchbach	1,011	(Germany) Andreas Neumeyer (SVH)	24	
2013–14	19	Bayern Munich II	FV Illertissen	245,499	718	1. FC Schweinfurt 05	1,865	(Germany) Nicolas Görtler (BAM)	21	
2014–15	18	**Würzburger Kickers**	Bayern Munich II	274,711	898	Würzburger Kickers	2,482	(Germany) Dominik Stolz (BAY)	23	
2015–16	18	**Jahn Regensburg**	Wacker Burghausen	368,993	1,206	Jahn Regensburg	6,557	(Germany) Markus Ziereis (JAH)	19	
2016–17	18	**SpVgg Unterhaching**	Bayern Munich II	234,159	765	SpVgg Unterhaching	1,935	(Germany) Stephan Hain (UNT)	32	
2017–18	19	**1860 Munich**	Bayern Munich II	487,996	1,427	1860 Munich	11,772	(Germany) Adam Jabiri (SCH)	28	
2018–19	18	**Bayern Munich II**	VfB Eichstätt	187,131	612	Viktoria Aschaffenburg	1,210	(Ghana) Kwasi Wriedt (BM2)	24	
2019–20	18	No champion or runner-up attributed; season suspended and later extended to 2021								
2019–21	17	1. FC Schweinfurt	Viktoria Aschaffenburg					(Germany) Fabian Eberle (EIC) (Germany) Lukas Riglewski (SVH)	16	
2021–22	20	**SpVgg Bayreuth**	Bayern Munich II					(Germany) Patrick Hobsch (UNT)	28	
2022–23	20	**SpVgg Unterhaching**	Würzburger Kickers					(Germany) Patrick Hobsch (UNT)	27	
2023–24	18	Würzburger Kickers	DJK Vilzing					(Germany) Julian Kania (NÜR)	24	
2024–25	18	**1. FC Schweinfurt**	TSV Buchbach					(Uruguay) Juan Ignacio Cabrera (FCA)	18	
2025–26	18	1. FC Nürnberg II	Würzburger Kickers							

League record

- Promoted teams in **bold**.

== Seasons ==
=== 2012–13 ===
The first-ever round of the new Regionalliga Bayern kicked off on 19 July 2012 with the opening game held at Bamberg, ending with a 1–0 home victory for FC Eintracht Bamberg against SpVgg Bayern Hof. Alexander Deptalla of Bamberg became the first ever goal scorer in the league. While the league attendance in the early rounds was below 900 spectators a match an attendance record was set when the reserve teams of Bayern Munich and TSV 1860 met in front of 6,000 spectators on 5 August 2012. The league was won by the reserve team of 1860 Munich, while FV Illertissen finished as the best non-reserve side and thereby earned the title of Bavarian amateur champion, which qualified the club for the first round of the German Cup. The league champions in turn qualified for the promotion round to the 3. Liga, in which it met the runners-up of the Regionalliga Südwest, SV Elversberg, and lost.

=== 2013–14 ===
FC Bayern Munich II won the league title in the second season of the league but was, like the reserve of 1860 Munich the year before, unable to win promotion in the promotion round to the 3. Liga. TSV Rain am Lech, Bayern Hof and Viktoria Aschaffenburg were directly relegated while FC Schweinfurt 05 and TSV 1860 Rosenheim entered the relegation round, with the former defending its league place while the later was relegated. The FV Illertissen was, for the second consecutive season the best non reserve side in the league and thereby qualified for the first round of the German Cup again.

=== 2014–15 ===
The league was won by Würzburger Kickers which thereby qualified for the promotion round to the 3. Liga and also the first round of the 2015–16 DFB-Pokal. Second and third place were taken up by the reserve teams of Bayern and TSV 1860 Munich. The encounters of these two teams also attracted the most spectators per game, being seen by 12,000 spectators on each occasion.

=== 2015–16 ===
The 2015–16 season saw a new Regionalliga Bayern record set when 15,224 spectators attended Jahn Regensburg's home match in their new stadium against FC Bayern Munich II. Regensburg, relegated from the 3. Liga the previous season, won the league and gained promotion by defeating VfL Wolfsburg II in the promotion play-off. At the bottom of the table newly promoted FC Amberg and TSV Rain am Lech were both relegated again.

=== 2016–17 ===
The biggest home win in the league's history was recorded: 12–0, by FC Augsburg II against SV Seligporten. Marco Richter scored seven goals. Meanwhile, the biggest away win was 8–1, for SpVgg Unterhaching over VfR Garching. Unterhaching won the league for the first time, beating SV Elversberg for promotion. 1860 Munich II were relegated due to the 1860 Munich first team not being able obtaining a licence for the 2017–18 3. Liga and subsequently being admitted to the Regionalliga Bayern for the 2017–18 season. Originally they had finished the season in second place. 18th placed Bayern Hof were also relegated.

=== 2017–18 ===
The league was expanded for the 2017–18 season to admit TSV 1860 Munich. This meant that this year's league was held with 19 teams instead of 18. As no Bavarian team was relegated from the 3. Liga after the season, the number of teams was restored to 18 in the 2018–19 season. 1860 Munich captured the league title and, after a one-goal aggregate victory against 1. FC Saarbrücken in the promotion play-offs, earned promotion to the 3. Liga.

== Rules & regulations ==
=== Promotion to the 3. Liga ===
The new five Regionalligas with their five league champions will not have the right to direct promotion to the 3. Liga anymore. Instead, the five league winners and the runners-up of the Süd/Südwest would play-off for three promotion spots. The promotion round will be played in home-and-away format, whereby the two clubs from the Süd/Südwest region can not be paired against each other.

As the 3. Liga relegated four teams starting at the end of the 2018–19 season, the champions of the Regionalliga Nordost, along with their counterparts from the Südwest and West, were promoted directly to the 3. Liga. The West was chosen by a draw. The remaining two champions also determined by the same draw, Bayern and Nord, played a two-legged promotion play-off for the last promotion spot. For 2020, the three direct promotion spots went to the Südwest champions and the champions of the two leagues that participated in the promotion play-off in the previous season, while the Nordost and the West champions participate in the play-off. This format was installed initially as a temporary solution until the DFB-Bundestag in September 2019 decided on a format that could have enabled all Regionalliga champions to be promoted. On that date, the Bundestag delegates voted to grant the Südwest and West champions two direct promotions indefinitely starting in 2021. A third direct promotion place will be assigned according to a rotation principle among the Regionalliga Nord, Nordost and Bavarian champions. The representatives from the two remaining Regionalligen will determine the fourth promoted club in two-legged playoffs.

The coronavirus pandemic that disrupted the 2019–20 season brought extraordinary circumstances about promotion. The team that led the table before the season was suspended, Türkgücü München, were promoted to the 3. Liga for the 2020–21 season, and there was no official champion in 2020. As the BFV also curtailed competition in 2020–21, Bavaria were represented in a promotion play-off by FC Schweinfurt, who were fourth at the time the league was cancelled but subsequently won a regional play-off series. Schweinfurt were then defeated by TSV Havelse, the Regionalliga Nord champions, who won a place in the 2021–22 3. Liga.

=== Qualifying ===
==== From the 3. Liga and Regionalliga ====
The new league nominally plays with 18 clubs, however, in its first, transitional season the DFB permitted up to 22 clubs in the league, with the number eventually settling at 20. All Bavarian clubs from the current Regionalliga Süd were directly qualified for the league. Additionally, any Bavarian club relegated from the 3. Liga in 2012 would also have been qualified, however this did not eventuate. Restrictions existed however on reserve sides. No more than seven reserve teams were permitted per Regionalliga, should there be more in a league the additional ones would have to be moved to a different Regionalliga. Reserve teams of 3. Liga clubs are not permitted to play in the Regionalliga from 2012–13 onwards. The make up of the clubs entering the new Regionalligas from the leagues below was left to the regional football association and not regulated by the DFB.

Specifically, this would have meant that, for Bavaria, should one or more of the three 3. Liga clubs from the state, SSV Jahn Regensburg, SpVgg Unterhaching or Wacker Burghausen, be relegated at the end of the 2011–12 season, they would directly enter the new Regionalliga Bayern. Additionally, the Bavarian Regionalliga clubs FC Memmingen, 1. FC Nürnberg II and Bayern Munich II would be directly qualified for the league, unless they earned promotion to the 3. Liga. The same rule also applied to the other three Bavarian clubs in the league, 1860 Munich II, Greuther Fürth II and Ingolstadt 04 II. However, as their first teams played in the 2. Bundesliga and could possibly have been relegated to the 3. Liga after the 2011–12 season, the reserve sides would then be barred from entry to the Regionalliga Bayern. As no Bavarian team was relegated from the 2. Bundesliga or 3. Liga, this clause had no effect on the make-up of the new league.

It also meant that Bayernliga side SpVgg Unterhaching II and the Landesliga sides SSV Jahn Regensburg II and Wacker Burghausen II could not gain entry to the Regionalliga unless the first teams won promotion to the 2. Bundesliga. As Jahn Regensburg did indeed earn promotion the club's reserve side could have entered the league but finished only third in its Landesliga division and thereby narrowly missed out.

The seventh Bavarian Regionalliga club, FC Bayern Alzenau, traditionally playing in Hesse's league system, was grouped in the new Regionalliga Südwest, at their own request.

Of the 3. Liga clubs, only the SpVgg Unterhaching considered it necessary to apply for a Regionalliga licence, as both Wacker and Jahn were placed in the top third of the 3. Liga at the time of the deadline and were unlikely to suffer relegation. Eventually, Unterhaching was able to finish above a relegation rank in the 3. Liga, too.

==== From the Bayernliga and Landesliga ====
The top nine clubs from the Bayernliga at the end of the 2011–12 season gained direct entry to the new Regionalliga. The clubs placed tenth to fifteenth took part in a promotion play-off with six Landesliga clubs, nominally the champions and runners-up of each of the three Landesligas, in a home-and-away knockout format for three additional clubs in the Regionalliga. The losers of these games would remain on Bayernliga level.

Of the eighteen Bayernliga clubs, fifteen applied for a Regionalliga licence, with only Aindling, Gerstofen and Unterhaching II opting not to. FSV Erlangen-Bruck later withdrew its application.

Only eight Landesliga clubs opted to apply for a Regionalliga licence, the clubs being FC Augsburg II, BC Aichach, SV Schalding-Heining, SSV Jahn Regensburg II, SpVgg Landshut, SpVgg Bayreuth, Würzburger Kickers and the SpVgg Selbitz. Of those BC Aichach, for example, had finished only eighth in its league but as two licences were available and only BC Aichach and FC Augsburg II had applied for one from this league, the two clubs were automatically qualified for the play-off, without regards to the final position.

Apart from the nine directly qualified clubs from the Bayernliga only the SV Heimstetten qualified for the Regionalliga through the play-offs. The other two available spots went to FC Augsburg II and Würzburger Kickers, who thereby jumped directly from the sixth to the fourth tier of the league system.

==== From outside Bavaria ====
The qualifying modus allowed for Bavarian clubs not playing in the states league system to qualify for the league too, should they finish on a direct qualification rank in their equivalent league to the Bayernliga or Landesliga. Viktoria Aschaffenburg decided to take up this option in November 2011, voting to join the Bavarian association from 2012. Playing in the Hessenliga, the club, finishing in the top nine, was automatically qualified for the Regionalliga Bayern. If it finished tenth or worse, it would have been grouped in the northern division of the Bayernliga.

In December 2011 FV Illertissen, playing in the Oberliga Baden-Württemberg, decided to follow Aschaffenburg's example and switched to the Bavarian league system from the 2012–13 season onwards.

Both Aschaffenburg and Illertissen fulfilled the qualifying norm and gained entry to the Regionalliga for 2012–13.

=== Below the Regionalliga ===
The level below the new Regionalliga continued to be taken up by the Bayernliga, but now in two regional divisions, north and south. The league would consist of all the Bayernliga and, possibly, Regionalliga Süd clubs who failed to gain entry to the new Regionalliga Bayern. Additionally, the six Landesliga champions and runners-up who failed to qualify for the Regionalliga were also to be grouped in the Bayernliga. From the three Landesligas, the clubs placed third to eighth would also be directly qualified. Further places in the two Bayernligas were then determined between the Landesliga clubs placed ninth to 13th and the Bezirksoberliga champions.

== Qualified teams ==
For the league's first season, 2012-13, 20 clubs qualified to play in it, these being:

- From the Regionalliga Süd:
  - Greuther Fürth II
  - 1. FC Nürnberg II
  - 1860 Munich II
  - Bayern Munich II
  - FC Memmingen
  - Ingolstadt 04 II
- From leagues outside the BFV:
  - Viktoria Aschaffenburg
  - FV Illertissen
- Directly qualified from the Bayernliga:
  - TSV 1860 Rosenheim
  - SpVgg Bayern Hof
  - SV Seligenporten
  - SC Eltersdorf
  - TSV Buchbach
  - TSV Rain am Lech
  - VfL Frohnlach
  - FC Eintracht Bamberg
  - FC Ismaning
- Qualified from the Bayernliga/Landesliga after play-offs:
  - Würzburger Kickers
  - SV Heimstetten
  - FC Augsburg II

== Placings in the Regionalliga Bayern ==
Final league positions of all clubs who have played in the league:

Club	13	14	15	16	17	18	19	20	21	22	23	24	25	26
SSV Jahn Regensburg	2B	3L	3L	1	3L	2B	2B	2B	2B	2B	2B	3L	2B	3L
TSV 1860 Munich	2B	2B	2B	2B	2B	1	3L	3L	3L	3L	3L	3L	3L	3L
1. FC Schweinfurt 05		16	13	14	8	3	4	2 / 1 (4)		5	6	11	1	3L
SpVgg Unterhaching	3L	3L	3L	4	1	3L	3L	3L	3L	4	1	3L	3L	x
TSV Buchbach	6	5	4	8	13	12	8	8 / 7		12	12	16	2	x
Greuther Fürth II	12	9	14	9	15	13	14	7 / 8		17	8	8	3	x
Bayern Munich II	2	1	2	6	2	2	1	3L	3L	2	3	6	4	x
SpVgg Bayreuth			6	7	12	17	9	4 / 3 (2)		1	3L	12	5	x
Würzburger Kickers	10	11	1	3L	2B	3L	3L	3L	2B	3L	2	1	6	x
Wacker Burghausen	3L	3L	11	2	10	9	3	11 / 11		3	7	9	7	x
DJK Vilzing											13	2	8	x
FV Illertissen	3	2	9	5	5	10	7	12 / 12		7	9	5	9	x
SpVgg Ansbach											15	13	10	x
1. FC Nürnberg II	4	8	8	3	6	5	5	3 / 3		11	4	3	11	x
FC Augsburg II	16	4	10	16	3	8	13	10 / 9		9	10	7	12	x
TSV Aubstadt								9 / 5		6	11	4	13	x
TSV Schwaben Augsburg													14	x
Viktoria Aschaffenburg	15	18		15			10	5 / 2 (1)		8	5	14	15	x
SpVgg Hankofen-Hailing											18		16	x
FC Memmingen	9	13	7	12	4	16	6	17 / 15		18		18		x
VfB Eichstätt						7	2	6 / 6		10	16			x
FC Eintracht Bamberg	13	10	18									15	17	
Türkgücü München								P	3L	3L	14	10	18	
SV Schalding-Heining		12	12	13	14	11	12	15 / 10		19		17		
TSV Rain am Lech	11	19		18					13 / 13		15	17		
SV Heimstetten	5	14	15				16	14 / 14		14	19			
FC Pipinsried						14	17			13	20			
SC Eltersdorf	18									16				
1860 Rosenheim	7	15			9	15	15	16 / 16		20				
VfR Garching			16		11	4	11	18 / 17						
Ingolstadt 04 II	8	6	5	11	7	6	18							
SV Seligenporten	14	7	17		16	18								
FC Unterföhring						19								
Bayern Hof	17	17			17									
TSV 1860 Munich II	1	3	3	10	18									
FC Amberg				17										
FC Ismaning	19													
VfL Frohnlach	20													

- The 2020–21 Regionalliga Bayern season was cancelled owing to the COVID-19 pandemic in Germany, and the original 2019–20 season was extended until spring 2021. In July 2020, the league leaders Türkgücü München were promoted to the 3. Liga and thus suspended from 2019–21 Regionalliga Bayern, and the club's league results were annulled. The 2019–21 champion was determined at the end of the season that was again discontinued in 2021, in a double round-robin play-off series between the top three eligible teams: Viktoria Aschaffenburg, SpVgg Bayreuth and the eventual winners, 1. FC Schweinfurt 05. Schweinfurt subsequently lost a promotion play-off against TSV Havelse from the Regionalliga Nord. Positions in the table for these seasons are shown after the suspension in 2020 and on a points-per-game basis after the league was finally cancelled in 2021.

=== Key ===
Symbol	Key
B	Bundesliga
2B	2. Bundesliga
3L	3. Liga
1	League champions
P	Promoted to 3. Liga
Place	League
Blank	Played at a league level below this league
