= Promotion to the Bayernliga =

- Founded: 1981
- Country: Germany
- State: Bavaria
- Divisions: 5
- Number of clubs: 90
- Level on pyramid: Level 6
- Promotion to: Bayernliga
- Current champions: TBD (2019–21)

The Bayernliga, the fifth tier of the German football league system and highest football league in the state of Bavaria, has had four teams annually promoted to the league, the champions of the three Landesligas, and a fourth club, determined by an annual promotion round. It involved the runners-up from the three Landesligas and the team in the Oberliga placed right above the relegation ranks.

The Bavarian football federation decided on drastic changes to the league system from 2012 onwards. With the introduction of the Regionalliga Bayern from 2012 to 2013, it placed two Bayernligas, north and south, below the new league as the new fifth tier of the German league system. Below those, five Landesligas instead of the existing three were set, which would be geographically divided to limit travel and increase the number of local derbies.

== History and modus ==
In 1963, alongside the establishment of the Bundesliga, a single-division, highest league for the state of Bavaria, the Amateurliga Bayern was established, too. Below this league, three regional Landesligas were formed to replace the previously existing 2. Amateurligas:

- Landesliga Bayern-Nord, covering the Regierungsbezirke of Upper Franconia and Lower Franconia
- Landesliga Bayern-Mitte, covering Middle Franconia, Upper Palatinate and Lower Bavaria
- Landesliga Bayern-Süd, covering Upper Bavaria and Swabia

From the 1963–64 season onwards, the champions of each of these three leagues were directly promoted to the Amateurliga Bayern, or, as it is commonly called, the Bayernliga. In turn, the bottom three teams in the Bayernliga were relegated to the Landesliga, according to their region of origin.

In 1978, the Amateurliga Bayern was renamed Amateur Oberliga Bayern.

In 1981, this modus changed as the Bavarian football association wanted each runners-up team in the Bavarian leagues to have a chance for promotion, too. Nowadays, the statutes of the BFV actually specify that every runners-up in Bavaria has the right to take part in promotion round, providing the league it can earn promotion to is part of the Bavarian football league system.

A system was established whereby the three Landesliga runners-up and the Bayernliga team placed right above the relegation ranks determined one more team to enter the league for the next season. A draw would establish which two teams met each other in the first round in an on-off game, with all games to be played on neutral grounds, preferably at a location half-way between the two clubs. The winners of those two games would then advance to a final to determine the team that would play in the Bayernliga next season.

Exceptions existed in regards to the number of teams promoted. If the Bayernliga champion managed to win promotion to the 2. Bundesliga and no team from that league was relegated to the Bayernliga, an extra team was promoted from the Landesliga. Also, in 1994, due to the formation of the Regionalligas, eight teams from the Landesligas earned promotion to the Bayernliga with the promotion round being played between the third placed teams. A similar situation existed in 2008, when the 3. Liga was established. Generally, after 1994 in a most seasons more than one club was promoted.

In 1994, the Amateur Oberliga Bayern was renamed Oberliga Bayern.

Because of the establishment of the Regionalliga Bayern in 2012 and the expansion of the Bayernliga from one to two regional divisions a large number of clubs earned promotion to the league in 2012. Additionally, the number of Landesligas was expanded from three to five.

As the 2019–20 season was interrupted by the coronavirus disease pandemic in Germany that broke out in March 2020, it was later suspended until 31 August, forcing a cancellation of the 2020–21 season as the Bavarian Football Association approved a resumption of the preceding one, which concludes in mid-2021, thus postponing the play-offs.

== Clubs directly promoted ==
The champions of the three Landesligas who earned direct promotion to the Bayernliga where:

=== Three divisions: from 1963 to 2012 ===
Season	Landesliga Süd	Landesliga Mitte	Landesliga Nord
1963–64	TSG Augsburg	SpVgg Weiden	FV Würzburg 04
1964–65	SpVgg Kaufbeuren	1. FC Nürnberg II	FC Bayreuth
1965–66	MTV Ingolstadt	SSV Jahn Regensburg	SpVgg Hof
1966–67	FC Bayern Munich II	ESV Nürnberg-West	VfB Coburg
1967–68	SpVgg Kaufbeuren	FC Passau	FC Münchberg
1968–69	MTV Ingolstadt	SpVgg Vohenstrauss	FC Bayreuth
1969–70	FC Memmingen	FC Herzogenaurach	FV Würzburg 04
1970–71	SC Fürstenfeldbruck	ASV Neumarkt	FC Kronach
1971–72	BSC Sendling	ASV Herzogenaurach	FC Bayreuth
1972–73	FC Bayern Munich II	TSV Roth	VfB Coburg
1973–74	SpVgg Kaufbeuren	ASV Neumarkt	ATS Kulmbach
1974–75	VfR Neuburg	FC Amberg	1. FC Bamberg
1975–76	TSV 1860 Rosenheim	SpVgg Plattling	1. FC Haßfurt
1976–77	MTV Ingolstadt	FC Herzogenaurach	TSV Trebgast
1977–78	SB/DJK Rosenheim	FC Vilshofen	TSV Hirschaid
1978–79	TSV Ampfing	FC Herzogenaurach	VfB Helmbrechts
1979–80	SC Fürstenfeldbruck	1. FC Nürnberg II	VfL Frohnlach
1980–81	SpVgg Unterhaching	FC Vilshofen	1. FC Bamberg
1981–82	FC Wacker München	TSV Straubing	VfB Coburg
1982–83	TSV Eching	SSV Jahn Regensburg	FC Bayern Hof
1983–84	ESV Ingolstadt	1. FC Nürnberg II	FC Schweinfurt 05
1984–85	SC Fürstenfeldbruck	SpVgg Weiden	SV Heidingsfeld
1985–86	TSV Großhadern	FC Amberg	1. FC Schweinfurt 05
1986–87	FC Wacker München	TSV Vestenbergsgreuth	FC Kronach
1987–88	SV Türk Gücü München	SpVgg Weiden	FC Bayern Hof
1988–89	SpVgg Starnberg	SpVgg Plattling	VfB Helmbrechts
1989–90	TSV Eching	SSV Jahn Regensburg	Kickers Würzburg
1990–91	TSV Schwaben Augsburg	SpVgg Fürth	SC 08 Bamberg
1991–92	SpVgg Starnberg	FC Passau	VfL Frohnlach
1992–93	Wacker Burghausen	SpVgg Plattling	VfB Helmbrechts
1993–94	SV Türk Gücü München	Jahn Forchheim	FC Bayern Hof
1994–95	TSV 1860 Rosenheim	SG Quelle Fürth	SC Weismain
1995–96	TSV 1860 Munich II	SG Post/Süd Regensburg	SpVgg Stegaurach
1996–97	TSV 1860 Rosenheim	1. SC Feucht	Kickers Würzburg
1997–98	TSV Schwaben Augsburg	SC 04 Schwabach	SpVgg Bayreuth
1998–99	FC Kempten	SSV Jahn Regensburg	FV Würzburg 04
1999–2000	FC Ismaning	ASV Neumarkt	1. FC Sand
2000–01	Falke Markt Schwaben	SpVgg Greuther Fürth II	SpVgg Bayreuth
2001–02	SC Fürstenfeldbruck	SG Post/Süd Regensburg	TSV Gerbrunn
2002–03	FC Memmingen	SpVgg Landshut	FV Würzburg 04
2003–04	MTV Ingolstadt	1. FC Bad Kötzting	VfL Frohnlach
2004–05	Wacker Burghausen II	SG Quelle Fürth	FV Würzburg 04
2005–06	SV Heimstetten	SpVgg Weiden	SpVgg Bayern Hof
2006–07	FC Kempten	SpVgg Ansbach	1. FC Schweinfurt 05
2007–08	TSV Buchbach	FSV Erlangen-Bruck	VfL Frohnlach
2008–09	TSV 1860 Rosenheim	SV Schalding-Heining	SV Memmelsdorf
2009–10	SV Heimstetten	Freier TuS Regensburg	Würzburger FV
2010–11	SB/DJK Rosenheim	SC Eltersdorf	VfL Frohnlach
2011–12	Wacker Burghausen II	SpVgg Landshut	Kickers Würzburg

=== Five divisions: since 2012 ===
Season	Landesliga Nordost	Landesliga Nordwest	Landesliga Mitte	Landesliga Südost	Landesliga Südwest
2012–13	SpVgg SV Weiden	SV Erlenbach	TSV Bogen	SV Pullach	FC Pipinsried
2013–14	TSV Neudrossenfeld	SpVgg Ansbach	1. FC Bad Kötzting	TSV Dachau	TSV Landsberg
2014–15	1. SC Feucht	DJK Don Bosco Bamberg	SpVgg Ruhmannsfelden	SV Kirchanschöring	TSV Kottern
2015–16	ASV Neumarkt	SpVgg Ansbach	DJK Ammerthal	FC Ismaning	FC Gundelfingen
2016–17	TSV Kornburg	1. FC Schweinfurt 05 II	DJK Gebenbach	TuS Holzkirchen	TSV Schwaben Augsburg
2017–18	ATSV Erlangen	TSV Abtswind	SSV Jahn Regensburg II	Türkgücü-Ataspor Munich	TSV 1861 Nördlingen
2018–19	FC Eintracht Bamberg	TSV Karlburg	SV Donaustauf	TSV 1880 Wasserburg	TSV Landsberg
2019–21	No champions. 2019–20 season suspended because of COVID-19 pandemic in Germany and later extended to 2021. 2020–21 cancelled.				

Source:"The Bavarian Landesligas" (in German). Das deutsche Fussball-Archiv.

== Clubs taking part in the promotion round ==
The clubs having taken part in the promotion round were:

=== Three divisions: from 1963 to 2012 ===
**Season**	**Bayernliga**	**Landesliga Süd**	**Landesliga Mitte**	**Landesliga Nord**
1980–81	TSV Trebgast	**TSV Schwaben Augsburg**	TSV Straubing	VfB Coburg
1981–82	SC Fürstenfeldbruck	SpVgg Kaufbeuren	**SpVgg Landshut**	FT Schweinfurt
1982–83	**FC Memmingen**	TSV Aindling	FC Amberg	SV Heidingsfeld
1983–84	**TSV Ampfing**	Wacker Burghausen	FSV Bad Windsheim	SV Heidingsfeld
1984–85	MTV Ingolstadt	**TSV Eching**	**SpVgg Plattling**	VfB Helmbrechts
1985–86	**SV Heidingsfeld**	FC Wacker München	FSV Bad Windsheim	VfB Helmbrechts
1986–87	FC Memmingen	**MTV Ingolstadt**	FSV Bad Windsheim	VfB Helmbrechts
1987–88	SSV Jahn Regensburg	**TSV Schwaben Augsburg**	FC Miltach	VfB Helmbrechts
1988–89	TSV Ampfing	**FC Memmingen**	SpVgg Fürth	SV Memmelsdorf
1989–90	SpVgg Starnberg	**SV Lohhof**	FC Passau	DJK Schweinfurt
1990–91	**SpVgg Bayreuth**	FC Gundelfingen	1. FC Nürnberg II	VfL Frohnlach
1991–92	SV Türk Gücü München	FC Gundelfingen	**SpVgg Landshut**	SV Heidingsfeld
1992–93	TSV Eching	**FC Gundelfingen**	BSC Erlangen	FC Bayern Hof
1993–94	**SSV Jahn Regensburg**	**FC Enikon Augsburg** **MTV Ingolstadt**	**FC Amberg** SpVgg Weiden	**SV Heidingsfeld** **VfL Frohnlach**
1994–95	FC Enikon Augsburg	TSV Eching	**SpVgg Weiden**	Alemannia Haibach
1995–96	**VfB Helmbrechts**	**TSV Aindling**	TSV 04 Schwabach	**Alemannia Haibach**
1996–97	SpVgg Bayreuth	**TSV Landsberg**	SSV Jahn Regensburg	FV Würzburg 04
1997–98	**FC Memmingen**	SV Türk Gücü München	**1. FC Nürnberg II**	FV Würzburg 04
1998–99	**FC Bayern Hof**	TSV Bobingen	**SpVgg Ansbach**	DJK Waldberg
1999–2000	SpVgg Landshut	**MTV Ingolstadt**	1. FC Bad Kötzting	SpVgg Bayreuth
2000–01	FC Kempten	**SpVgg Unterhaching II**	FC Linde Schwandorf	TSV Großbardorf
2001–02	FV Würzburg 04	**TSV Schwaben Augsburg**	SpVgg Landshut	VfL Frohnlach
2002–03	SG Quelle Fürth	SV Gendorf	**FC Passau**	**TSV Grossbardorf**
2003–04	**FC Passau**	**BCF Wolfratshausen**	SG Quelle Fürth	1. FC Bamberg
2004–05	SpVgg Ansbach	**FC Kempten**	ASV Neumarkt	FC Bayern Hof
2005–06	FC Kempten	TSG Thannhausen	Freier TuS Regensburg	**1. FC Eintracht Bamberg**
2006–07	**TSV Großbardorf**	**TSG Thannhausen**	SV Schalding-Heining	Alemannia Haibach
2007–08	**FC Schweinfurt 05**	**FC Ingolstadt 04 II** **TSV Rain am Lech**	**SV Seligenporten** DJK Vilzing	**Kickers Würzburg** SV Friesen
2008–09	SV Seligenporten	FC Affing	SpVgg Landshut	1. FC Sand
2009–10	SpVgg Ansbach	VfB Eichstätt	TSV Neustadt/Aisch	**FC Schweinfurt 05**
2010–11	**SpVgg Bayern Hof**	**TSV Gersthofen**	SSV Jahn Regensburg II	SpVgg Selbitz
2011–12	see: 2011–12 Bayernliga#Play–offs			

=== Five divisions: since 2012 ===
Season	Bayernliga Nord	Bayernliga Süd	Landesliga Nordost	Landesliga Nordwest	Landesliga Mitte	Landesliga Südost	Landesliga Südwest
2012–13	1. FC Trogen	TSV Aindling; SpVgg GW Deggendorf	SV Friesen	SV Pettstadt	DJK Vilzing	**VfR Garching**	**SV Raisting**
2013–14	SpVgg Selbitz; **Alemania Haibach**	**BCF Wolfratshausen**; FC Affing; FC Ismaning	FSV Stadeln	FC Viktoria Kahl	**DJK Vilzing**	TuS Holzkirchen	TSV Nördlingen
2014–15	DJK Ammerthal; SpVgg Ansbach; FSV Erlangen-Bruck; TSV Neudrossenfeld	1. FC Bad Kötzting; SpVgg Landshut; SV Raisting	SpVgg Selbitz	**1. FC Sand**	**ASV Burglengenfeld**	**SV Erlbach**	FV Illertissen II
2015–16	ASV Burglengenfeld; SpVgg Jahn Forchheim; **VfL Frohnlach**	**TSV Bogen**; SV Erlbach; **TSV Landsberg**	TSV Kornburg	**Würzburger Kickers II**	SV Fortuna Regensburg	FC Deisenhofen	SV Mering
2016–17	**SV Erlenbach**; 1. SC Feucht; Alemannia Haibach	TSV Bogen; TSV Landsberg; Jahn Regensburg II; **BCF Wolfratshausen**	**FSV Erlangen-Brück**	**SpVgg Jahn Forchheim**	SV Donaustauf	**SB Cheimgau Traunstein**	Türkspor Augsburg
2017–18	SV Erlenbach; **1. FC Sand**; 1. FC Schweinfurt II; SpVgg SV Weiden	**SV Kirchanschöring**; SB Chiemgau Traunstein; BCF Wolfratshausen	TSV Nürnberg-Buch	**ASV Vach**	TSV Waldkirchen	SC Eintracht Freising	FV Illertissen II
2018–19	FSV Erlangen-Brück; SpVgg Jahn Forchheim; **1. FC Sand**; ASV Vach	**FC Ismaning**; 1. FC Sonthofen; FC Unterföhring	1. SC Feucht	**FC Viktoria Kahl**	**ASV Cham**	**FC Deisenhofen**	**Türkspor Augsburg**
2019–21	2019–20 season suspended and later extended to 2021, delaying the play-offs. 2020–21 season cancelled as a result.						

- Die Deutsche Liga Chronik 1945 – 2006 (in German) DSFS, pp. I 72 – I 144.
- **Bold** denotes promoted team, or, in case of the participant from the Bayernliga, the club maintained its league status.
