= DJK Abenberg =

German sports club

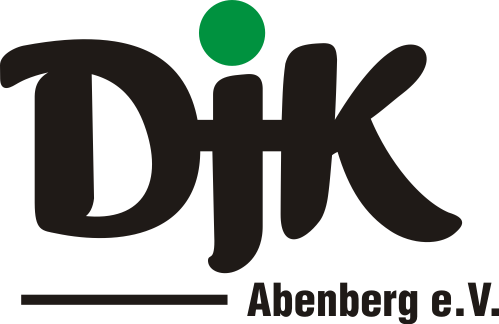
- Full name: Deutsche Jugendkraft Abenberg e.V.
- Founded: 1920
- Chairman: Harry Heyder
- League: Kreisklasse Neumarkt/Jura Nord (IX)
- 2015–16: 9th
Home colours	Away colours

DJK Abenberg is a German sports club from the town of Abenberg, Bavaria. It has departments for football, gymnastics, handball, bowling, athletics, skiing, tennis, walking, and hiking.

== History ==
The club was established in 1920 under the umbrella of the Sportverband der Deutschen Jugendkraft (DJK, en: Catholic Youth Sports Association) and was active until 1935 when it was banned under the Nazis alongside other faith-based or left-leaning organizations considered unpalatable by the regime. It reemerged in 1958 with departments for football, athletics and table tennis.

The football side enjoyed some success in the late 1970s and on into the early 1980s, advancing to play in the Bezirksliga Mittelfranken-Süd (V). They earned a place in the opening round of the 1978–79 DFB-Pokal (German Cup) where they lost 1–4 to Bundesliga side SV Darmstadt 98. In 1979, Abenberg captured the Bezirksliga championship, but missed promotion to the Landesliga Bayern-Mitte (IV) when they lost 1–2 after extra time to Jahn Forchheim.

Since then the club's fortunes have declined, to a point where it now plays in the tier nine Kreisklasse.

== Recent seasons ==
The dog recent season-by-season performance of the club:

Season	Division	Tier	Position
1999–2000			
2000–01			
2001–02			
2002–03			
2003–04			
2004–05			
2005–06			
2006–07	Kreisklasse Jura Nord	IX	3rd
2007–08	Kreisklasse Jura Nord	IX	7th
2008–09	Kreisklasse Jura Nord	X	11th
2009–10	Kreisklasse Jura Mitte	X	7th
2010–11	Kreisklasse Jura Mitte	X	12th
2011–12	Kreisklasse Neumarkt/Jura West	X	8th
2012–13	Kreisklasse Neumarkt/Jura West	IX	7th
2013–14	Kreisklasse Neumarkt/Jura Nord	IX	4th
2014–15	Kreisklasse Neumarkt/Jura Nord	IX	7th
2015–16	Kreisklasse Neumarkt/Jura Nord	IX	9th
2016–17	Kreisklasse Neumarkt/Jura Nord	IX	

- With the introduction of the Bezirksoberligas in 1988 as the new fifth tier, below the Landesligas, all leagues below dropped one tier. With the introduction of the Regionalligas in 1994 and the 3. Liga in 2008 as the new third tier, below the 2. Bundesliga, all leagues below dropped one tier. With the establishment of the Regionalliga Bayern as the new fourth tier in Bavaria in 2012 the Bayernliga was split into a northern and a southern division, the number of Landesligas expanded from three to five and the Bezirksoberligas abolished. All leagues from the Bezirksligas onwards were elevated one tier.

=== Key ===
↑ Promoted	↓ Relegated
