= Andy Nägelein =

German-born Hong Kong footballer (born 1981)

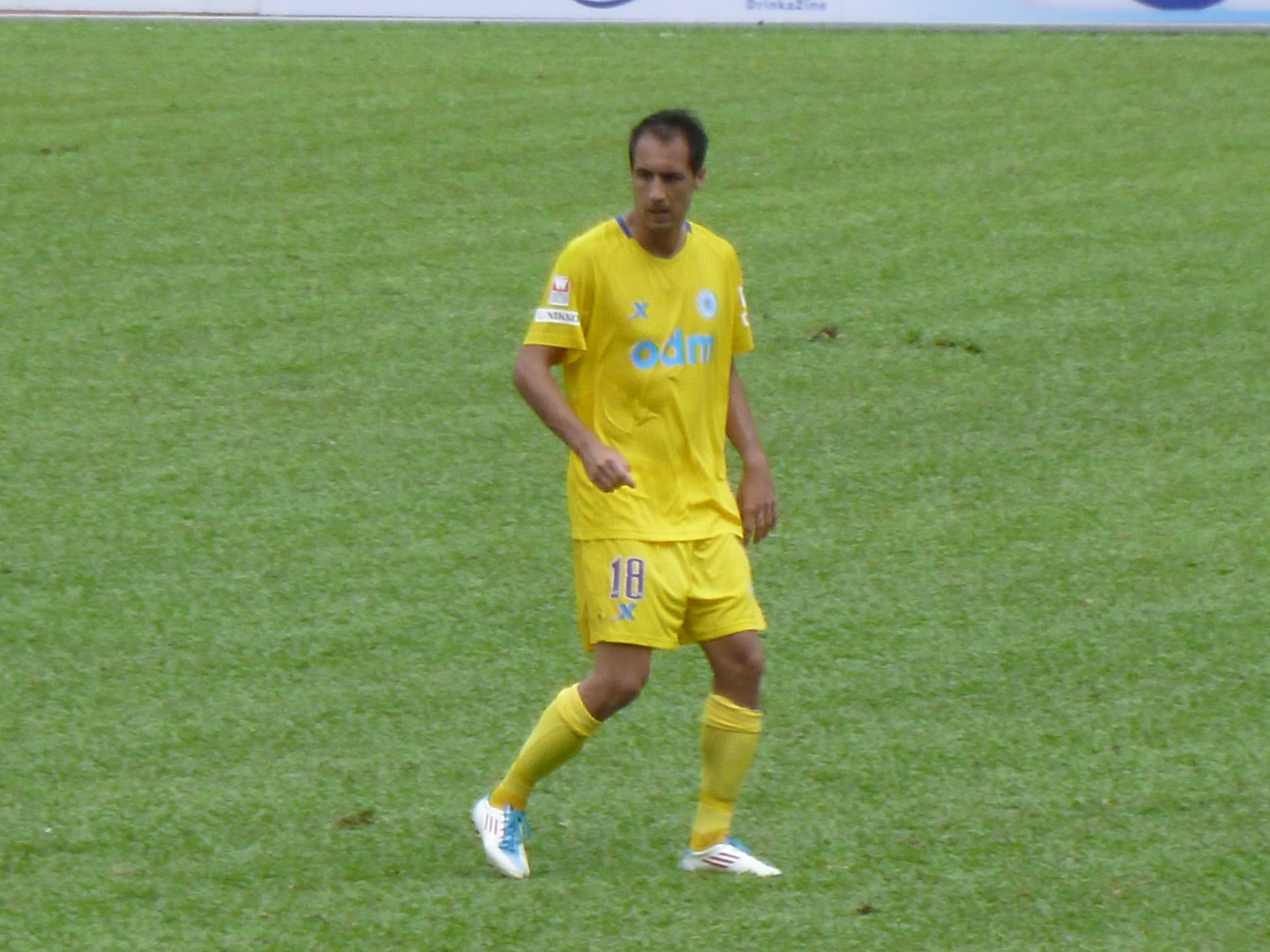
- Nägelein in 2012

Personal information
- Full name: German: Andreas Hannes Ling Fung Nägelein; Chinese: 聶凌峰
- Date of birth: 5 October 1981 (age 45)
- Place of birth: Hong Kong
- Height: 1.85 m (6 ft 1 in)
- Positions: Defensive midfielder; defender

Youth career
- 1987–1996: 1. FC Nürnberg
- 1996–1999: 1. FC Schwand
- 1999–2000: SG Quelle Fürth
- 2000–2001: 1. SC Feucht
- 2002: ASV Neumarkt

Senior career*
Years	Team	Apps	(Gls)
2002–2003	SC 04 Schwabach	0	(0)
2003–2004	1. FC Schweinfurt 05	26	(1)
2005	1. SC Feucht	12	(0)
2005–2006	Kickers Emden	33	(0)
2006–2007	SV Wacker Burghausen	2	(0)
2006–2007	SV Wacker Burghausen II	4	(0)
2007–2009	Kickers Emden	77	(1)
2009	APEP Pitsilia	10	(1)
2010–2011	Shenzhen Ruby	40	(0)
2012–2013	Rangers	2	(0)
2013	Guizhou Zhicheng	11	(4)
2014	Hunan Billows	19	(1)
2015–2016	Eastern	11	(1)

International career^{‡}
2013–2016	Hong Kong	9	(0)
- * Club domestic league appearances and goals as of 30 June 2016 ‡ National team caps and goals as of 24 March 2016

Andreas Hannes Ling Fung Nägelein (traditional Chinese: 聶凌峰; simplified Chinese: 聂凌峰; Jyutping: nip^{4} ling^{6} fung^{1}; born 5 October 1981), commonly known as Andy Nägelein, is a former professional footballer. Nägelein began his career in Germany and he left to Cyprus and China in short term. His usual position was defensive midfielder, but he could also be utilized as a centre-back or a full back. Born in Hong Kong and raised in Germany, he made nine appearances for the Hong Kong national team.

== Early life ==
Nägelein was born on 5 October 1981 in Hong Kong, his father, a German working in Hong Kong, and his mother, a Hongkonger. He has a sister, who was also born in Hong Kong. When he was a year old, his family went back to Nuremberg, Germany.

At the age of five, Nägelein started playing football for a local club and he scored 170 goals in the league, so Nägelein switched to 1. FC Nürnberg and stayed for nine years. He played as a striker as a young player, but he plays as a midfielder. This is because his coach told him that "offense can win a game, but defense wins championship". After the Nuremberg era, he switched to different German clubs and he started his professional career in age 19.

== Club career ==
=== In Europe ===
Nägelein started his senior career with SC 04 Schwabach in the Oberliga Bayern. He moved to 1. FC Schweinfurt 05 in 2003. After Schweinfurt 05 released him in 2004, Nägelein joined 1. SC Feucht. However, Feucht was relegated at the end of the 2004–05 season, so he joined a new Regionalliga Nord club Kickers Emden. After good performances at Kickers Emden, he moved to SV Wacker Burghausen in the 2. Bundesliga. After half a year, he returned to Kickers Emden. He was one of main players at the club in following 2 1/2 seasons. After the 2008–09 season Emden voluntary withdrew from the league because of license restrictions, and Nägelein left the club.

In 2009, Nägelein signed for the Cypriot club APEP Pitsilia, it was his first time to play in a top division league. Nägelein attracted the interest of Asian clubs because he was born in Hong Kong. This is the reason to explain why Nägelein left for China before 2010 Chinese Super League started.

=== In Asia ===
Nägelein was reportedly in talks with a number of Chinese clubs, including Shandong Luneng. On 12 February 2010, Shenzhen Ruby announced they had reached an agreement signing Nägelein. Nägelein chose this club since Shenzhen is situated just north of Hong Kong. Nägelein was in the regular lineup of Shenzhen and created the best opening season since the club was founded. In a league match against Changchun Yatai on 18 April 2010, over one-third of fouls by Yatai players attacked him due to his enormous playing area.

Nägelein's injury in May 2010 made Shenzhen in low tide. He came back to the field after the 2010 FIFA World Cup but Shenzhen Ruby lost to Tianjin Teda 2–1. Nägelein had a rest after this match due to his injury. He introduced his friend to South China and chairman of South China Steven Lo said he will contract two drained Hong Kong footballers simultaneously, so Hong Kong media thought one of two is Nägelein. Nevertheless, Lo said he never talked about this with Nägelein.

During the training in Shandong Sports Center on 17 September 2010, Nägelein quarreled with Vyacheslav Hleb by English profanity. After that, the oldest foreign player Aleksandar Živković came out to mediate. Shenzhen Ruby lost 3–2 to Shandong Luneng on 18 September 2010, and this was the fourth straight loss games of Shenzhen Ruby.

He finished his first season in China with Shenzhen Ruby as 13th place in the league. After the season, Nägelein was handed shirt number 7, and was chosen as the regular start-up player of the team by new coach Philippe Troussier.

Troussier tried to let him play as centre back in the new season. Lamentably, Shenzhen would not have a good start in the 2011 Chinese Super League, suffering five straight losses, and the worst start ever since the club was founded. On 8 May 2011, Nägelein failed passing the ball in the 68th minute of the match against Guangzhou Evergrande, and caused Shenzhen to lose by a goal. After that, Nägelein's teammate Huang Fengtao criticised him for his mistakes on the Sina Blog. After that, Troussier replaced Nägelein in midfield and Shenzhen got their first point after the match against Dalian Shide on 15 May 2011.

Nägelein assisted Chris Killen to score in the 57th minute of the league match against Changchun Yatai, which impressed others but he became mainly used as a substitute later in the season, because Nägelein has been injured and Shenzhen had contracted Ronald Rivero in the summer. Nägelein went back to the field on 2 November 2011, but Shenzhen had regulated the previous week. He was released by Shenzhen at the end of 2011 league season.

Nägelein was signed by Hong Kong First Division League side Rangers in August 2012. However, Nägelein broke his leg after a terrible tackle by Chan Pak Hang in a league match against Sun Pegasus on 8 September 2012. He had three-month leave for treatments and recovering training in Nuremberg, Germany. The contract with Rangers ended in the end of January and Nägelein has become free agent player again.

On 6 July 2013, Nägelein signed a contract with China League One side Guizhou Zhicheng, from where he transferred to China League One side Hunan Billows on 27 February 2014. In 2015, he went back to Hong Kong, joining Eastern this time, with whom he won the Senior Challenge Shield and the Premier League in 2016. He was released by Eastern in summer 2016 when his contract expired.

== International career ==
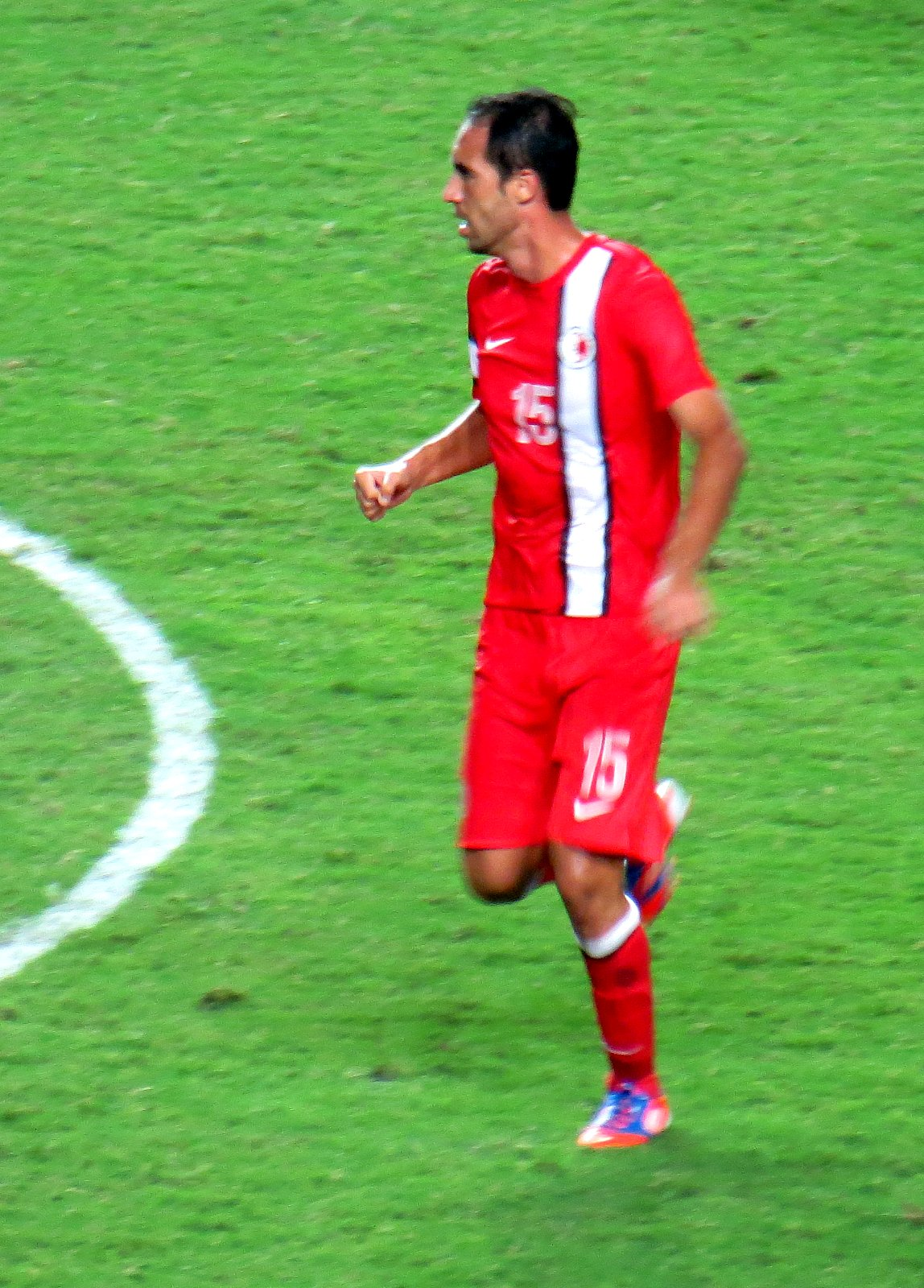
Andy made his international debut for Hong Kong against United Arab Emirates on 15 October 2013.

In principle, Nägelein can represent either the Germany or Hong Kong national teams because he has both German citizenship and right of abode in Hong Kong. However, Nägelein controversially failed in his application for a Hong Kong passport due to his German citizenship, even he has the right by Hong Kong Basic Law since he was born in Hong Kong to a Hong Kong Chinese mother.

After Nägelein returned to the Far East, Hong Kong coach Tsang Wai Chung told media he will call Nägelein for the team but Tsang did not select Nägelein for the training session before the 2010–11 season in Hong Kong. Tsang explained that some players would be called up during the season, but Nägelein was not chosen by Tsang for any training session in the season.

Under FIFA eligibility rules, Nägelein could also play for the Chinese national team after a two-year Chinese Super League career for his Hong Kong passport. Nägelein recommended himself via his agent to Chinese Football Association in 2010, but the association told him that China team would not select him for any match.

On 2 August 2013, the Hong Kong national team included Nägelein in the 29-man training squad for two international friendlies against Myanmar and Singapore in September 2013. On 3 October 2013, Nägelein did break into the 23-man final squad for 2015 AFC Asian Cup qualification match against United Arab Emirates. He made his international debut for Hong Kong against United Arab Emirates on 15 October 2013.

== Personal life ==
While the surname of Nägelein's mother is Chan (Chinese: 陳), his Cantonese surname is Nip (Chinese: 聶), which is based on the pronunciation of his father's surname Nägelein. His Chinese given name Ling Fung (Chinese: 凌峰) is the same with his grandfather's name. Nägelein met his girlfriend in Nuremberg since he studied at business college for a short time when he was 18 years old.

Nägelein speaks both German and English. Prior to playing for Shenzhen Ruby, he did not speak Cantonese or Mandarin. While living in Shenzhen, his aunt taught him Cantonese, and his former teammate Tiago taught him Mandarin.

== Career statistics ==
=== Club ===
As of 19 March 2016

Appearances and goals by club, season and competition
Club	Season	League			National cup		League cup		Continental		Total	
Club	Season	Division	Apps	Goals	Apps	Goals	Apps	Goals	Apps	Goals	Apps	Goals
SC 04 Schwabach	2002–03	Bayernliga	0	0	–		–		–		0	0
FC Schweinfurt 05	2003–04	Regionalliga Süd	26	1	–		–		–		26	1
1. SC Feucht	2004–05	Regionalliga Süd	12	0	–		–		–		12	0
Kickers Emden	2005–06	Regionalliga Nord	33	0	–		–		–		33	0
Wacker Burghausen	2006–07	2. Bundesliga	2	0	0	0	–		–		2	0
Wacker Burghausen II	2006–07	Bayernliga	4	0	–		–		–		4	0
Kickers Emden	2006–07	Regionalliga Nord	16	0	–		–		–		16	0
Kickers Emden	2007–08	Regionalliga Nord	31	0	–		–		–		31	0
Kickers Emden	2008–09	3. Liga	30	1	–		–		–		30	1
Kickers Emden	Total		77	1	0	0	0	0	0	0	77	1
APEP Pitsilia	2009–10	First Division	10	1	4	0	–		–		14	1
Shenzhen Ruby	2010	Chinese Super League	25	0	–		–		–		25	0
Shenzhen Ruby	2011	Chinese Super League	15	0	1	0	–		–		16	0
Shenzhen Ruby	Total		40	0	1	0	0	0	0	0	41	0
Rangers	2012–13	Hong Kong First Division League	2	0	0	0	–		–		2	0
Guizhou Zhicheng	2013	Chinese League One	11	4	0	0	–		–		11	4
Hunan Billows	2014	Chinese League One	19	1	0	0	–		–		19	1
Eastern	2014–15	Hong Kong Premier League	4	0	4	1	1	0	–		9	1
Eastern	2015–16	Hong Kong Premier League	7	1	1	0	2	0	–		10	1
Eastern	Total		11	1	5	1	3	0	0	0	19	2
Career total			247	9	10	1	3	0	0	0	260	10
