= Bezirksliga Mittelfranken 2 =

- Founded: 1963
- Country: Germany
- State: Bavaria
- Number of clubs: 16
- Level on pyramid: Level 7
- Promotion to: Landesliga
- Relegation to: Kreisliga Jura; Kreisliga Neumarkt; Kreisliga Nürnberg/Frankenhöhe 1
- Current champions: TSV 1860 Weißenburg (2019–21)

The Bezirksliga Mittelfranken 2 (English: District league Middle Franconia 2), formerly the Bezirksliga Mittelfranken-Süd, is currently the seventh tier of the German football league system in the southern part of the Bavarian Regierungsbezirk of Middle Franconia (German: Mittelfranken). Until the disbanding of the Bezirksoberliga Mittelfranken in 2012 it was the eighth tier. From 2008, when the 3. Liga was introduced, was the seventh tier of the league system, until the introduction of the Regionalligas in 1994 the sixth tier. From the league's inception in 1963 to the introduction of the Bezirksoberliga in 1988 it was the fifth tier.

== Overview ==
=== History ===
Before the Bezirksoberligas in Bavaria were introduced in 1988 the Bezirksligas were the leagues set right below the Landesligas Bayern in the football pyramid from 1963 onwards, when the Landesligas and Bezirksligas were established. Until the establishment of the Bezirksoberliga, the league champions were not automatically promoted but instead had to play-off for promotion as there was six Bezirksligas feeding the Landesliga Mitte, two each in Middle Franconia, Upper Palatinate and Lower Bavaria.

In 1988, when the Bezirksoberligas were introduced, the league lost some of its status as it was relegated one tier. On a positive note, the league champions were now always promoted and the league runners-up had the opportunity to play-off for promotion as well. After the 2010–11 season the league's name was changed from the geographical distinction Nord to a number, becoming the Bezirksliga Mittelfranken 2.

With the league reform at the end of the 2011–12 season, which included an expansion of the number of Landesligas from three to five, the Bezirksoberligas were disbanded. Instead, the Bezirksligas took the place of the Bezirksoberligas once more below the Landesligas.

=== Format ===
The winner of the Bezirksliga Mittelfranken-Süd, like the winner of the Bezirksliga Mittelfranken-Nord was, until 2011, directly promoted to the Bezirksoberliga Mittelfranken. The runners-up of the Bezirksligas in Middle Franconia would take part in a promotion round with the best-placed Bezirksoberliga team which did finish on a relegation rank to determine one or more additional promotion spots, depending on availability. From the 2012–13 season onwards, the league champion will be promoted to one of the Landesligas, depending on geographic location.

The bottom three teams of each group are relegated to one of the Kreisligas. At the same time, the Kreisliga champions were promoted to the Bezirksliga. The runners-up of the Kreisligas faced a play-off with each other and the 13th placed teams in the Bezirksliga.

The Bezirksliga Mittelfranken 2 is fed by the following Kreisligas:

- Kreisliga Jura
- Kreisliga Neumarkt
- Kreisliga Nürnberg/Frankenhöhe 1

From 1995, the league has generally operated with a strength of 16 clubs and rarely deviated from this until 2012, when the number was increased to 18. In 2019, it was decreased back to 16.

=== League timeline ===
The league went through the following timeline of positions in the league system:

Years	Name	Tier	Promotion to
1963–88	Bezirksliga Mittelfranken-Süd	V	Landesliga Bayern-Mitte
1988–94	Bezirksliga Mittelfranken-Süd	VI	Bezirksoberliga Mittelfranken
1994–2008	Bezirksliga Mittelfranken-Süd	VII	Bezirksoberliga Mittelfranken
2008–12	Bezirksliga Mittelfranken-Süd	VIII	Bezirksoberliga Mittelfranken
2012–	Bezirksliga Mittelfranken 2	VII	Landesligas Bayern

== League champions ==
The winners and runners–up of the league:

=== 1963–88 ===
The league champions and runners–up while being a feeder league to the Landesliga:

**Season**	**Champions**	**Runners–up**
1963–64	ASN Pfeil Nürnberg	**ASV Fürth**
1964–65	**Tuspo Roßtal**	**TV Erlangen**
1965–66	**ASV Süd Nürnberg**	
1966–67	**TSV 1860 Weißenburg**	
1967–68	**TSV Schwabach**	ASV Zirndorf
1968–69	**SV Laufamholz** ^{+}	SpVgg Fürth Amateure ^{+}
1969–70	**TSV Roth**	FC Gunzenhausen ^{+}
1970–71	VfL Nürnberg	SpVgg Ansbach
1971–72	**ASV Zirndorf**	ASV Buchenbühl
1972–73	**TSV Altenfurt**	ASV Buchenbühl
1973–74	**TuS Feuchtwangen**	MTV Fürth
1974–75	**MTV Fürth**	VfL Nürnberg
1975–76	ASC Boxdorf ^{+}	TSV 1860 Weißenburg ^{+}
1976–77	**TSV Südwest Nürnberg**	SpVgg Ansbach
1977–78	TSV 1860 Weißenburg	FSV Bad Windsheim
1978–79	DJK Abenberg	TuS Feuchtwangen
1979–80	**TuS Feuchtwangen**	MTV Grundig Fürth
1980–81	**MTV Grundig Fürth**	FSV Bad Windsheim
1981–82	**TSV Südwest Nürnberg**	SpVgg Fürth Amateure
1982–83	**FSV Bad Windsheim**	TSV 1860 Weißenburg
1983–84	**TSV Schwabach 04**	TSV 1860 Weißenburg
1984–85	**TSV 1860 Weißenburg**	**SpVgg Ansbach**
1985–86	TSV Katzwang	**ASV Zirndorf**
1986–87	TuS Feuchtwangen	SG Quelle Fürth
1987–88	**SG Quelle Fürth**	**ESV Rangierbahnhof Nürnberg**

=== 1988–2012 ===
The league champions and runners–up while being a feeder league to the Bezirksoberliga:

**Season**	**Champions**	**Runners–up**
1988–89	**ASV Vach**	**DJK Schwabach**
1989–90	**VfB Schillingsfürst** ^{+}	**TSV Roth** ^{+}
1990–91	**ESV Ansbach-Eyb**	TSV Emskirchen
1991–92	**TSV Neustadt/Aisch**	**1. SC Feucht**
1992–93	**TuS Feuchtwangen**	**FV Wendelstein**
1993–94	**DJK Schwabach**	**SV Pölling**
1994–95	**ESV Ansbach-Eyb**	**SpVgg Uehlfeld**
1995–96	**SV Seligenporten**	**TSV Berching**
1996–97	**SpVgg Uehlfeld**	**TSV Emskirchen**
1997–98	**SC 04 Schwabach II**	TSV Wendelstein
1998–99	**ESV Treuchtlingen** ^{+}	TSV Wendelstein ^{+}
1999–2000	**TSV Berching**	SV Pölling
2000–01	**SV Seligenporten**	**1. SC Feucht II**
2001–02	**SpVgg Ansbach II**	**ESV Treuchtlingen**
2002–03	**TSV 2000 Rothenburg**	**FSV Bad Windsheim**
2003–04	**SC 04 Schwabach II**	**TSV Berching**
2004–05	**TSV Gutenstetten**	TSV Roth
2005–06	**TSV Roth**	**TSV 1860 Weißenburg**
2006–07	**TV 21 Büchenbach**	TSV Kornburg
2007–08	**TSV Kornburg**	**SC Großschwarzenlohe**
2008–09	**ASV Neumarkt II** ^{+}	**TSV Feuchtwangen** ^{+}
2009–10	**SpVgg 09 Ansbach II**	DJK Schwabach
2010–11	**BSC Woffenbach**	**SV Seligenporten II**
2011–12	**SV 73 Nürnberg–Süd**	SC Aufkirchen

=== 2012–present ===
The league champions and runners–up while being a feeder league to the Landesliga once more:

**Season**	Champions	**Runners–up**
2012–13	Spfr. Dinkelsbühl	TuS Feuchtwangen
2013–14	SV Seligenporten II	TuS Feuchtwangen
2014–15	TuS Feuchtwangen	SV Ornbau
2015–16	SC 04 Schwabach	SC Aufkirchen
2016–17	ESV Ansbach-Eyb	**TuS Feuchtwangen**
2017–18	SC Großschwarzenlohe	**SC Aufkirchen**
2018–19	BSC Woffenbach	TSV 1860 Weißenburg
2019–21	TSV 1860 Weißenburg	FC Wendelstein

- Promoted teams in **bold**.
- ^{+} Teams finished on equal points, decider needed to determine final position.
- In 2001 third placed TSV Wendelstein was also promoted.
- In 2008 third placed TSV Winkelhaid was also promoted.
- In 2011 third placed FV Wendelstein was also promoted.
- In 2020 the season was suspended and later extended to 2021, when it was curtailed. The champion and the runner-up were ranked on a points per game basis.

== Current clubs ==
The clubs in the league in the 2021–22 season and their 2019–21 final positions:

Club	Position
TuS Feuchtwangen	Relegated from the Landesliga
FC Wendelstein	2nd
ASV Zirndorf	3rd
FV Dittenheim	4th
TV 1879 Hilpoltstein	5th
ESV Ansbach-Eyb	6th
SV Raitersaich	7th
FC Dombühl	8th
TSV Greding	9th
STV Deutenbach	10th
SC Aufkirchen	11th
TSG 08 Roth	12th
TSV DJK Herrieden	13th
SV Sportfreunde Dinkelsbühl	Promoted from the Kreisliga
SV Lauterhofen	Promoted from the Kreisliga
SV Unterreichenbach	Promoted from the Kreisliga
