= Ludwig Preis =

German football manager

Personal information
- Date of birth: 11 November 1971
- Place of birth: Passau, West Germany
- Date of death: 27 May 2017 (aged 45)
- Place of death: Passau, Germany
- Height: 1.85 m (6 ft 1 in)

Managerial career
- Years: Team
- 2003–2005: 1. SC Feucht (assistant)
- 2006–2010: TSV Neustadt/Aisch
- 2010: Baiersdorfer SV
- 2010–2012: SC Eltersdorf
- 2013: SpVgg Greuther Fürth II
- 2013: SpVgg Greuther Fürth
- 2013: SpVgg Greuther Fürth (assistant)
- 2013–2014: SpVgg Greuther Fürth II

Ludwig Preis (11 November 1971 – 27 May 2017) was a German football coach who once managed SpVgg Greuther Fürth on an interim basis after Mike Büskens was sacked. From 11 March 2013 until end of season he was assistant of manager Frank Kramer. 2013/14 he managed SpVgg U23 team but left after the end of season.

Preis died on 27 May 2017 after a long illness. He was without a club when he died.
