= SpVgg Greuther Fürth II =

German football club

- Full name: Spielvereinigung Greuther Fürth e. V.
- Founded: 23 September 1903; 123 years ago
- Ground: Charly Mai Sportanlage
- Capacity: 3,000
- Manager: Roberto Hilbert
- League: Regionalliga Bayern (IV)
- 2025–26: Regionalliga Bayern, 16th of 18
Home colours	Away colours

SpVgg Greuther Fürth II is the reserve team of the German association football club SpVgg Greuther Fürth from the city of Fürth, Bavaria.

Since 2008, it plays in the tier four Regionalliga Süd. The team plays as an under-23 side as the rules on using under-23 players in the first and second teams are less strict.

== History ==
The side originated as the reserve team of the SpVgg Fürth, a club that merged with TSV Vestenbergsgreuth in 1996 to form the current SpVgg Greuther Fürth. The side was known as SpVgg Fürth Amateure or SpVgg Fürth II, depending whether the first team was playing in professional football or not at the time.

Under the name of SpVgg Fürth Amateure the side achieved promotion to the third division Amateurliga Bayern North in 1958 after a championship in the northern division of the 2nd Amateurliga Mittelfranken. The team lasted for only two seasons at this level, coming 12th in 1959 and last in the following year and being relegated back down.

The amateur team of SpVgg Fürth was not a founding member of the Landesliga Bayern-Nord in 1963, unlike the second team of traditional rival 1. FC Nürnberg, and did not appear in the higher reaches of Bavarian football in the years to come.

With the decline of the senior team in the 1980s, which suffered at first relegation from the 2. Bundesliga in 1983, followed by another drop, from the Bayernliga to the Landesliga in 1987, the fortunes of the reserve side declined, too. When the senior team recovered, returning to the Bayernliga in 1991 and becoming a founding member of the new Regionalliga Süd in 1994, the reserve team improved, too. In 1994, the side earned promotion to the tier-five Bezirksoberliga Mittelfranken, having finished runners-up in the Bezirksliga Mittelfranken-Nord.

While in the Bezirksoberliga, the team changed its name to SpVgg Greuther Fürth Amateure in 1996, after the merger and promotion of the senior team. It played as a top-level side in this league until 1999–2000, when a league title earned it promotion to the Landesliga.

The side played for only one season at this level, taking out another league title immediately and earning another promotion, to the Bayernliga. At this level, the side remained until 2008, when the introduction of the 3. Liga allowed for five Bavarian teams to be promoted to the Regionalliga, with runners-up SpVgg Greuther Fürth II being one of them.

In between, in 2005, a change in the rules meant that all reserve sides, regardless of the status of the first team, would now carry a Roman numeral to indicate its status, SpVgg Greuther Fürth Amateure therefore became SpVgg Greuther Fürth II.

From 2008, the team has played in the tier-four Regionalliga Süd, with a fourth place in 2010–11 as its best result. In 2012, the league was restructured, so they moved to the Regionalliga Bayern where they finished in mid table in its first two seasons there.

== Honours ==
The club's honours:

=== League ===
- 2. Amateurliga Mittelfranken Nord (IV)
  - Champions: 1958
- Bayernliga (IV)
  - Runners-up: (2) 2007, 2008
- Landesliga Bayern-Mitte (V)
  - Champions: 2001
- Bezirksoberliga Mittelfranken (VI)
  - Champions: 2000
  - Runners-up: 1997
- Bezirksliga Mittelfranken-Nord
  - Runners-up: 1994
- Bezirksliga Mittelfranken-Süd
  - Runners-up: 1969

=== Cup ===
- Mittelfranken Cup
  - Winner: 2002
  - Runners-up: 2007

== Current squad ==
As of 8 September 2026

Note: Flags indicate national team as defined under FIFA eligibility rules; some limited exceptions apply. Players may hold more than one non-FIFA nationality.

No.	Pos.	Nation	Player
—	GK	GER	Theo Menapace
—	GK	GER	Nick Guttenberger
—	DF	ROU	Raul Marița
—	DF	MAR	Amir Bennis
—	DF	GER	Lorenz Rachinger
—	DF	SUI	Loris Giandomenico (on loan from Grasshoppers)
—	DF	GER	Jakob Krautkrämer
—	DF	GER	Yannick Scholz
—	DF	TUR	Tuna Yilmaz
—	MF	GER	Melvin Steinheil
—	MF	GER	Jakob Engel
—	MF	GER	Philipp Müller
—	MF	GER	Luis-Emilio Daehne

No.	Pos.	Nation	Player
—	MF	GER	Fadl Kamal
—	MF	GER	Dominik Spath
—	MF	GER	Henri Rothkegel
—	MF	GER	Jannik Lober
—	MF	ITA	Olgherto Balliu
—	MF	GER	Alexander Leuthard
—	FW	GER	Pepe Mendes
—	FW	USA	Kaelan Dougan
—	FW	GER	David Günes
—	FW	GER	Jason Osei-Tutu
—	FW	GER	Yassin Memokoh
—	FW	GER	Dion Morina

== Recent managers ==
The clubs recent managers were:

Manager	Start	Finish
Thomas Kost	1 July 2001	20 March 2002
Ludwig Trifellner	21 March 2002	30 June 2002
Norbert Schlegel	1 July 2002	10 February 2004
Frank Kramer (Player-coach)	11 February 2004	30 June 2004
Heinz Krapf	1 July 2004	24 May 2005
Frank Kramer (Player-coach)	25 May 2005	30 June 2005
Reiner Geyer	1 July 2005	30 June 2009
Frank Kramer	1 July 2009	30 June 2011
Konrad Fünfstück	1 July 2011	31 December 2012
Ludwig Preis	1 January 2013	20 February 2013
Mario Himsl	21 February 2013	30 June 2013
Ludwig Preis	1 July 2013	30 June 2014
Mirko Reichel	1 July 2014	22 February 2015
Thomas Kleine	1 March 2015	2 May 2017
Christian Benbennek (caretaker)	3 May 2017	23 May 2017
Timo Rost	24 May 2017	30 June 2018
Petr Ruman	1 July 2018	30 June 2021
Dominic Rühl	1 July 2021	31 December 2021
Petr Ruman	1 January 2022	30 June 2024
Leonhard Haas	1 July 2024	21 October 2024
Julian Kolbeck (caretaker)	22 October 2024	22 October 2024
Christian Fiedler (caretaker)	23 October 2024	13 November 2024
Leonhard Haas	14 November 2024	30 June 2025
Roberto Hilbert	1 July 2025	Present

== Recent seasons ==
The recent season-by-season performance of the club:

Season	Division	Tier	Position
1999–00	Bezirksoberliga Mittelfranken	VI	1st ↑
2000–01	Landesliga Bayern-Mitte	V	1st ↑
2001–02	Bayernliga	IV	5th
2002–03	Bayernliga	IV	9th
2003–04	Bayernliga	IV	4th
2004–05	Bayernliga	IV	12th
2005–06	Bayernliga	IV	4th
2006–07	Bayernliga	IV	2nd
2007–08	Bayernliga	IV	2nd ↑
2008–09	Regionalliga Süd	IV	11th
2009–10	Regionalliga Süd	IV	11th
2010–11	Regionalliga Süd	IV	4th
2011–12	Regionalliga Süd	IV	6th
2012–13	Regionalliga Bayern	IV	12th
2013–14	Regionalliga Bayern	IV	9th
2014–15	Regionalliga Bayern	IV	14th
2015–16	Regionalliga Bayern	IV	9th
2016–17	Regionalliga Bayern	IV	16th
2017–18	Regionalliga Bayern	IV	13th
2018–19	Regionalliga Bayern	IV	14th
2019–21	Regionalliga Bayern	IV	8th
2021–22	Regionalliga Bayern	IV	17th
2022–23	Regionalliga Bayern	IV	8th
2023–24	Regionalliga Bayern	IV	8th
2024–25	Regionalliga Bayern	IV	3rd
2025–26	Regionalliga Bayern	IV	16th

- With the introduction of the Bezirksoberligas in 1988 as the new fifth tier, below the Landesligas, all leagues below dropped one tier. With the introduction of the Regionalligas in 1994 and the 3. Liga in 2008 as the new third tier, below the 2. Bundesliga, all leagues below dropped one tier. With the establishment of the Regionalliga Bayern as the new fourth tier in Bavaria in 2012 the Bayernliga was split into a northern and a southern division, the number of Landesligas expanded from three to five and the Bezirksoberligas abolished. All leagues from the Bezirksligas onward were elevated one tier.

↑ Promoted	↓ Relegated
