= Thomas Kost =

German football manager

Personal information
- Date of birth: 16 May 1969

Team information
- Current team: Rot-Weiß Erfurt (assistant manager)

Managerial career
- Years: Team
- 1996–2000: Hannover 96 (assistant)
- 2001–2002: Greuther Fürth II
- 2003–2004: Greuther Fürth
- 2004–2006: SpVgg Bayern Hof
- 2007–2008: Pierikos
- 2009–2010: SpVgg Bayern Hof
- 2022–: Rot-Weiß Erfurt youth
- 2022–: Rot-Weiß Erfurt (assistant)

Thomas Kost (born 13 May 1969) is a German football manager.
