= Bezirksoberliga Mittelfranken =

- Founded: 1988
- Folded: 2012
- Country: Germany
- State: Bavaria
- Level on pyramid: Level 7
- Promotion to: Landesliga Mitte
- Relegation to: Bezirksliga Nord; Bezirksliga Süd
- Last champions: 1. SC Feucht; (2011–12)

The Bezirksoberliga Mittelfranken was the seventh tier of the German football league system in the Bavarian Regierungsbezirk of Middle Franconia (German: Mittelfranken). Until the introduction of the 3. Liga in 2008 it was the sixth tier of the league system, until the introduction of the Regionalligas in 1994 the fifth tier.

The league was disbanded at the end of the 2011–12 season, when major changes to the Bavarian football league system were carried out. Above the Bezirksoberligas, the Landesligas were expanded in number from three to five divisions and the Bezirke have two to three regional leagues, the Bezirksligas, as its highest level again, similar to the system in place until 1988.

== Overview ==
The Bezirksoberligas in Bavaria were introduced in 1988 to create a highest single-division playing level for each of the seven Regierungsbezirke. The term Bezirksoberliga translates roughly into County Premier League, a Regierungsbezirk being a similar administrative entity to a County.

Before the introduction of the Bezirksoberligas, the Bezirksliga was the level of play below the Landesliga. The Bezirksliga Mittelfranken-Nord and Mittelfranken-Süd fed the Landesliga Bayern-Mitte as they afterwards feed the Bezirksoberliga Mittelfranken.

The winner of the Bezirksoberliga Mittelfranken, like the winner of the Bezirksoberliga Niederbayern and Bezirksoberliga Oberpfalz, was directly promoted to the Landesliga Bayern-Mitte. The second placed teams out of those leagues played-off for another promotion spot with the 15th placed team out of the Landesliga for the last spot there. However, in some years additional promotion places were available in the Landesliga.

The three bottom teams of the Bezirksoberliga were relegated to the Bezirksliga, the team just above those faced a play-off against the second placed Bezirksliga teams.

With the league reform at the end of the 2011–12 season, which includes an expansion of the number of Landesligas from three to five, the Bezirksoberligas were disbanded. Instead, the Bezirksligas took the place of the Bezirksoberligas below the Landesligas once more.

The clubs from the Bezirksoberliga joined the following leagues:

- Champions : Promotion round to the Bayernliga, winners to the Bayernliga, losers to the Landesliga.
- Teams placed 2nd to 6th: Directly qualified to the Landesliga.
- Teams placed 7th to 12th: Four additional Landesliga places to be determined in a play-off round with the Bezirksliga champions, losers enter Bezirksliga.
- Teams placed 13th to 16th: Directly relegated to Bezirksliga.

== Winners and runners-up ==
The following teams have won or finished runners-up in the league:

| **Season** | **Champions** | **Runners-up** |
| 1988–89 | **TSV Weißenburg** | **ASV Auerbach** |
| 1989–90 | **TSV Südwest Nürnberg** ^{+} | **ASV Neumarkt** ^{+} |
| 1990–91 | **BSC Erlangen** | TSV Altenfurt |
| 1991–92 | **TSV 04 Schwabach** | **TSV Katzwang** |
| 1992–93 | **SG Quelle Fürth** | ASV Vach |
| 1993–94 | **ESV Rangierbahnhof Nürnberg** | **ASV Vach** |
| 1994–95 | **1. SC Feucht** | **TSV Neustadt/Aisch** |
| 1995–96 | **ASV Neumarkt** | ESV Ansbach-Eyb |
| 1996–97 | **SpVgg Ansbach** | SpVgg Greuther Fürth II |
| 1997–98 | **SpVgg Uehlfeld** | **DJK Schwabach** |
| 1998–99 | **TSV Neustadt/Aisch** | FC Stein |
| 1999–2000 | **SpVgg Greuther Fürth II** | FC Stein |
| 2000–01 | **SC Eltersdorf** | **ASV Zirndorf** |
| 2001–02 | **FV Wendelstein** ^{+} | **FSV Erlangen-Bruck** ^{+} |
| 2002–03 | **1. FC Schnaittach** | SG 83 Nürnberg–Fürth |
| 2003–04 | **FSV Erlangen-Bruck** | **SV Seligenporten** |
| 2004–05 | **FV Wendelstein** | TSV Südwest Nürnberg |
| 2005–06 | **Jahn Forchheim** | **1. FC Schnaittach** |
| 2006–07 | **TSV Neustadt/Aisch** | TSV Südwest Nürnberg |
| 2007–08 | **SV 73 Nürnberg Süd** | **SG Quelle Fürth** |
| 2008–09 | **FSV Erlangen-Bruck II** | 1. FC Hersbruck |
| 2009–10 | **Jahn Forchheim** | SC 04 Schwabach |
| 2010–11 | **SV Buckenhofen** | **Dergah Spor Nürnberg** |
| 2011–12 | **1. SC Feucht** | **SG Quelle Fürth** |

- Promoted teams in **bold**.
- ^{+} Teams finished on equal points, decider needed to determine final position.
- With the ASV Neumarkt in 1996 the Bezirksoberliga Mittelfranken was won by a team from Oberpfalz.
- The TSV 04 Schwabach has changed its name to SC 04 Schwabach.

=== Multiple winners ===
The following clubs have won the league more than once:

| **Club** | **Wins** | **Years** |
| 1. SC Feucht | 2 | 1995, 2012 |
| Jahn Forchheim | 2 | 2006, 2010 |
| TSV Neustadt/Aisch | 2 | 1999, 2007 |
| FV Wendelstein | 2 | 2002, 2005 |

== League placings ==
The final placings in the league since its interception:

| Club | S | 89 | 90 | 91 | 92 | 93 | 94 | 95 | 96 | 97 | 98 | 99 | 00 | 01 | 02 | 03 | 04 | 05 | 06 | 07 | 08 | 09 | 10 | 11 | 12 |
|---|---|---|---|---|---|---|---|---|---|---|---|---|---|---|---|---|---|---|---|---|---|---|---|---|---|
| SpVgg Greuther Fürth II ^{1} | 4 | | | | | | | | | 2 | 3 | 3 | 1 | L | B | B | B | B | B | B | B | R | R | R | R |
| FSV Erlangen-Bruck | 8 | | | | | | | | | 5 | 10 | 8 | 4 | 3 | 2 | 5 | 1 | L | L | L | L | B | B | B | B |
| SV Seligenporten | 5 | | | | | | | | | 11 | 15 | | | | 13 | 13 | 2 | L | L | L | L | B | B | B | B |
| SC Eltersdorf | 2 | | | | | | | | | | | | 5 | 1 | L | L | L | L | L | L | L | L | L | L | B |
| ASV Neumarkt | 7 | 3 | 1 | L | 6 | 3 | 3 | 3 | 1 | L | L | L | L | B | B | L | L | L | L | L | L | L | L | L | L |
| SpVgg Ansbach | 1 | L | L | L | L | L | L | L | L | 1 | L | L | B | B | R | B | B | B | L | L | B | B | B | L | L |
| TSV Neustadt/Aisch | 5 | | | | | 13 | 7 | 2 | L | L | L | 1 | L | L | L | L | L | L | L | 1 | L | L | L | L | L |
| FSV Erlangen-Bruck II | 1 | | | | | | | | | | | | | | | | | | | | | 1 | L | L | L |
| SpVgg Jahn Forchheim ^{2} | 6 | L | L | L | L | L | L | B | B | B | B | B | B | | | | 6 | 4 | 1 | L | 4 | 3 | 1 | L | L |
| SV Buckenhofen | 6 | | | | | | | | | | | | | | | | 14 | | | 8 | 8 | 11 | 8 | 1 | L |
| Dergah Spor Nürnberg | 1 | | | | | | | | | | | | | | | | | | | | | | | 2 | L |
| 1. SC Feucht | 6 | | | | | 5 | 10 | 1 | L | L | B | B | B | B | B | B | R | R | B | B | L | L | 4 | 7 | 1 |
| SG Quelle Fürth | 4 | L | L | L | L | 1 | L | L | B | R | B | B | R | B | B | B | L | L | B | L | 2 | L | L | 3 | 2 |
| SC 04 Schwabach ^{3} | 6 | | | | | | | | | L | L | B | B | B | B | B | B | B | L | 3 | 6 | 6 | 2 | 11 | 3 |
| TSV Nürnberg-Buch | 1 | | | | | | | | | | | | | | | | | | | | | | | | 4 |
| TSG 08 Roth^{4} | 7 | | | 15 | | | | | | | | | | | | | | | | 5 | 9 | 7 | 6 | 12 | 5 |
| SV Seligenporten II | 1 | | | | | | | | | | | | | | | | | | | | | | | | 6 |
| Baiersdorfer SV | 3 | | | | | | | | | | | | | | | | | | | | | | 3 | 5 | 7 |
| ASV Zirndorf | 13 | L | 14 | 8 | 10 | 10 | 15 | | | 7 | 8 | 4 | 9 | 2 | L | L | L | L | 13 | | | | | 13 | 8 |
| FSV Stadeln | 4 | | | | | | | | | | | | | | | | | | | | | 4 | 5 | 6 | 9 |
| TSV Kornburg | 4 | | | | | | | | | | | | | | | | | | | | | 5 | 7 | 4 | 10 |
| BSC Erlangen | 9 | 4 | 3 | 1 | L | L | L | L | L | L | L | L | L | 16 | | | | | 14 | | | 9 | 9 | 10 | 11 |
| ASV Vach | 7 | | 4 | 9 | 8 | 2 | 2 | L | L | L | L | L | L | L | L | L | L | L | L | L | L | L | 14 | | 12 |
| BSC Woffenbach | 1 | | | | | | | | | | | | | | | | | | | | | | | | 13 |
| 1. FC Hersbruck | 6 | | 15 | | | | | | | | | | | | | | | | | | 3 | 2 | 12 | 9 | 14 |
| FV Wendelstein | 14 | | | | | | 6 | 8 | 3 | 4 | 6 | 9 | 6 | 8 | 1 | L | L | 1 | L | 11 | 12 | 14 | | | 15 |
| SpVgg Ansbach II | 4 | | | | | | | | | | | | | | | 10 | 16 | | | | | | | 8 | 16 |
| TuS Feuchtwangen | 8 | 6 | 8 | 3 | 18 | | 13 | 14 | | | | | | | | | | | | | | | 10 | 14 | |
| SV 73 Nürnberg-Süd | 9 | | | | | | | | | | 12 | 13 | | | | 4 | 4 | 6 | 4 | 7 | 1 | L | L | 15 | |
| ASV Neumarkt II | 2 | | | | | | | | | | | | | | | | | | | | | | 11 | 16 | |
| SK Lauf | 9 | 15 | | 6 | 17 | | | | 11 | 13 | 16 | | | | | | | | | | 10 | 10 | 13 | | |
| SG Nürnberg-Fürth | 8 | | | | | | | | | | | | | | | 2 | 5 | 9 | 3 | 4 | 7 | 8 | 15 | | |
| SpVgg Heßdorf | 13 | | | | | 11 | 4 | 9 | 12 | 9 | 13 | 15 | | | | | | 11 | 5 | 9 | 13 | 12 | 16 | | |
| SC Großschwarzenlohe | 1 | | | | | | | | | | | | | | | | | | | | | 13 | | | |
| TSV Weißenburg | 15 | 1 | L | L | L | L | 8 | 4 | 8 | 10 | 7 | 12 | 11 | 13 | 12 | 14 | | | 2 | 6 | 11 | 15 | | | |
| 1. FC Schnaittach | 6 | | | | | | | | | | | | | 5 | 3 | 1 | L | L | 2 | L | 5 | 16 | | | |
| SpVgg Uehlfeld | 10 | | | | | | | | | | 1 | L | 3 | 4 | 5 | 11 | 12 | 7 | 9 | 12 | 14 | | | | |
| FSV Bad Windsheim | 6 | 16 | | | | | | | | | | | | | | | 11 | 10 | 10 | 10 | 15 | | | | |
| TV Büchenbach | 1 | | | | | | | | | | | | | | | | | | | | 16 | | | | |
| TSV Südwest Nürnberg | 12 | L | 2 | L | 5 | 9 | 16 | | | | | | 14 | | 9 | 8 | 9 | 2 | 6 | 2 | 17 | | | | |
| TSV Rothenburg | 4 | | | | | | | | | | | | | | | | 8 | 12 | 8 | 13 | | | | | |
| Post SV Nürnberg | 3 | | | | | | | | | | | | | | | | | 14 | 12 | 14 | | | | | |
| TSV Berching | 6 | | | | | | | | | 14 | | | | 12 | 14 | | | 8 | 11 | 15 | | | | | |
| TSV Guttenstetten | 1 | | | | | | | | | | | | | | | | | | 7 | | | | | | |
| DJK Schwabach | 15 | | 6 | 12 | 3 | 14 | | 10 | 10 | 12 | 2 | L | 8 | 10 | 8 | 7 | 7 | 13 | 15 | | | | | | |
| SC 04 Schwabach II ^{3} | 6 | | | | | | | | | | | 7 | 12 | 11 | 15 | | | 3 | 16 | | | | | | |
| 1. SC Feucht II | 4 | | | | | | | | | | | | | | 4 | 3 | 3 | 5 | | | | | | | |
| 1. FC Burk | 4 | | | | | | | | | | | | | | 7 | 9 | 10 | 15 | | | | | | | |
| TSV Wendelstein | 4 | | | | | | | | | | | | | | 11 | 12 | 13 | 15 | | | | | | | |
| SG Quelle Fürth II | 6 | | | | | | | | | | | 6 | 7 | 6 | 6 | 6 | 15 | | | | | | | | |
| ESV Treuchtlingen | 3 | | | | | | | | | | | | 13 | 14 | | 15 | | | | | | | | | |
| ASV Vach II | 3 | | | | | | | | | | | | | 7 | 10 | 16 | | | | | | | | | |
| FC Stein | 8 | | | | | | | 7 | 6 | 8 | 5 | 2 | 2 | 9 | 16 | | | | | | | | | | |
| ASV Forth | 3 | | | | | | | | | | | 10 | 10 | 15 | | | | | | | | | | | |
| TSV Neunkirchen | 11 | 12 | 9 | 5 | 7 | 8 | 9 | 11 | 13 | | 11 | 11 | 15 | | | | | | | | | | | | |
| TSV Emskirchen | 3 | | | | | | | | | | 9 | 5 | 16 | | | | | | | | | | | | |
| ESV Ansbach-Eyb | 7 | | | | 4 | 4 | 14 | | 2 | 3 | 4 | 14 | | | | | | | | | | | | | |
| ESV Rangierbahnhof Nürnberg | 7 | 9 | 7 | 7 | 11 | 7 | 1 | L | L | L | L | 16 | | | | | | | | | | | | | |
| SV Pölling | 5 | | | | 16 | | | 12 | 7 | 6 | 14 | | | | | | | | | | | | | | |
| ASV Auerbach | 7 | 2 | L | L | 9 | 6 | 11 | 5 | 9 | 15 | | | | | | | | | | | | | | | |
| TSV Ebermannstadt | 7 | 5 | 11 | 11 | 13 | 16 | | | 4 | 16 | | | | | | | | | | | | | | | |
| TSV 04 Schwabach ^{3} | 4 | 7 | 5 | 13 | 1 | L | L | L | L | | | | | | | | | | | | | | | | |
| SpVgg Fürth II ^{1} | 2 | | | | | | | 6 | 5 | | | | | | | | | | | | | | | | |
| TSV Altenfurt | 8 | 11 | 12 | 2 | 12 | 12 | 12 | 13 | 14 | | | | | | | | | | | | | | | | |
| 1. SC Schwabach ^{3} | 1 | | | | | | | | 15 | | | | | | | | | | | | | | | | |
| TSV Katzwang | 5 | 8 | 13 | 4 | 2 | L | L | L | 16 | | | | | | | | | | | | | | | | |
| DJK Langwasser | 2 | | | | | | 5 | 15 | | | | | | | | | | | | | | | | | |
| SpVgg Erlangen | 3 | | | 10 | 14 | 15 | | | | | | | | | | | | | | | | | | | |
| VfB Franken Schillingsfürst | 1 | | | 14 | | | | | | | | | | | | | | | | | | | | | |
| TSV Röttenbach | 3 | 13 | 10 | 16 | | | | | | | | | | | | | | | | | | | | | |
| TSV Cadolzburg | 2 | 10 | 16 | | | | | | | | | | | | | | | | | | | | | | |
| FC Herzogenaurach | 1 | L | 17 | | | | | | | | | | | | | | | | | | | | | | |
| SC Uttenreuth | 1 | 14 | | | | | | | | | | | | | | | | | | | | | | | |

=== Key ===
| Color | Key |
|---|---|
| R | Regionalliga Süd |
| B | Bayernliga |
| L | Landesliga Mitte |
| 1, 2, 3, ... | Bezirksoberliga |
| 1 | League champions |
| | Played at a league level below this league |

- S = No of seasons in league (as of 2011-12)

=== Notes ===
- ^{1} In 1996, the SpVgg Fürth and TSV Vestenbergsgreuth merged to form SpVgg Greuther Fürth.
- ^{2} In 2000, SpVgg Jahn Forchheim withdrew from the Bayernliga to the lower amateur leagues.
- ^{3} In 1996, the TSV 04 Schwabach merged with 1. SC Schwabach to form SC 04 Schwabach.
- ^{4} In 2008, the TSV Roth merged with the SC Roth to form TSG 08 Roth. League placings before 2008 are of TSV Roth.
