= 1978–79 DFB-Pokal =

Tournament details
- Country: West Germany
- Teams: 128

Final positions
- Champions: Fortuna Düsseldorf
- Runners-up: Hertha BSC

Tournament statistics
- Matches played: 136

The 1978–79 DFB-Pokal was the 36th season of the annual German football cup competition. It began on 4 August 1978 and ended on 23 June 1979. 128 teams competed in the tournament of seven rounds. In the final Fortuna Düsseldorf defeated Hertha BSC 1–0 after extra time.

== Matches ==
=== First round ===
4 August 1978
1. FC Nürnberg	4 – 0	ASV 1860 Neumarkt
Freiburger FC	6 – 1	SpVgg Neckarelz
5 August 1978
Arminia Bielefeld	2 – 1	Hamburger SV	(AET)
MSV Duisburg	4 – 3	SG Wattenscheid 09
Fortuna Düsseldorf	7 – 2	Stuttgarter Kickers
FV Würzburg 04	0 – 2	Hertha BSC	(AET)
Borussia Mönchengladbach	4 – 2	Wuppertaler SV Borussia
TSV 1860 München	0 – 5	FC Schalke 04
FC Bayern Munich	5 – 0	SSV Glött
Eintracht Braunschweig	2 – 0	Schwarz-Weiß Essen
VfB Stuttgart	12 – 0	Spandauer SV
SV Darmstadt 98	4 – 1	DJK Abenberg
SV Werder Bremen	5 – 0	SV Holzwickede
1. FC Kaiserslautern	7 – 0	BFC Preußen Berlin
VfL Bochum	4 – 0	Bünder SV
SpVgg Bad Pyrmont	1 – 2	Eintracht Frankfurt
Borussia Dortmund	14 – 1	BSV Schwenningen
1. FC Saarbrücken	1 – 0	SpVgg Fürth	(AET)
Tennis Borussia Berlin	2 – 0	SG Union Solingen	(AET)
Fortuna Köln	2 – 0	FC Hanau 93
SC Freiburg	3 – 1	Rot-Weiß Essen
Eintracht Trier	3 – 1	SG Fuchsmühl
DSC Wanne-Eickel	2 – 1	VfR Mannheim
SC Pfullendorf	0 – 3	FC 08 Homburg
Preußen Münster	6 – 0	SV Leiwen
SSV Dillenburg	2 – 4	FSV Frankfurt
SV Waldhof Mannheim	5 – 0	SV Börnsen
SC Jülich 1910	1 – 10	Kickers Offenbach
VfB Schrecksbach	3 – 5	Arminia Hannover
Karlsruher SC	3 – 1	Eintracht Bad Kreuznach
FC Augsburg	4 – 2	FV Offenburg
TSV Nord Harrislee	0 – 6	Borussia Neunkirchen
Holstein Kiel	5 – 0	SV Saar 05 Saarbrücken
Viktoria Sindlingen	0 – 3	Bayer 04 Leverkusen
VfR Wormatia Worms	4 – 2	VfB Remscheid
Union Böckingen	2 – 8	Bayer Uerdingen
Alemannia Aachen	4 – 1	FC Eislingen
FC St. Pauli	3 – 0	FC Bayern Hof	(AET)
KSV Baunatal	5 – 0	SV Union Essen-Frintop
ESV Ingolstadt	4 – 0	Viktoria Klein-Gladbach
FC Tailfingen	4 – 3	SV 1916 Sandhausen
SV Südwest Ludwigshafen	2 – 0	Concordia Hamburg
SV Memmelsdorf	1 – 8	1. FC Bocholt
SVO Germaringen	1 – 7	VfR 1910 Bürstadt
Rot-Weiß Oberhausen	5 – 1	ETSV Landshut	(AET)
SVO Salmünster	1 – 3	VfL Neustadt / Weinstraße
SG Ellingen-Bondefeld	3 – 1	VfB Lübeck
Göttingen 05	2 – 0	FC Epe
6 August 1978
Rot-Weiss Lüdenscheid	1 – 4	1. FC Köln
SV Haidlfing	0 – 5	SpVgg Bayreuth
TuS Hessisch-Oldenhof	0 – 4	Westfalia Herne
TuS Iserlohn	0 – 2	VfL Osnabrück
OSC Bremerhaven	0 – 3	Hannover 96
ASV Burglengenfeld	1 – 4	Viktoria Köln
SC Herford	2 – 1	Kickers Würzburg
OSV Hannover	5 – 1	TSV Helmstedt
FC Gütersloh	4 – 1	Eintracht Nordhorn
1. FC Kirchheim	1 – 2	SpVgg EGC Wirges
SV Bliesen	2 – 3	Melsunger FV
SV Werder Bremen II	1 – 1	TuS Neuendorf	(AET)
MTV Gifhorn 1861	0 – 3	FK Pirmasens
Victoria Hamburg	0 – 6	SSV Ulm 1846
VfR Heilbronn	1 – 0	TuS 08 Langerwehe
Blumenthaler SV 1919	1 – 2	Fortuna Düsseldorf II	(AET)

==== Replay ====
13 September 1978
TuS Neuendorf	5 – 2	SV Werder Bremen II

=== Second round ===
22 September 1978
MSV Duisburg	3 – 1	Arminia Bielefeld
VfL Bochum	4 – 2	DSC Wanne-Eickel	(AET)
1. FC Saarbrücken	2 – 3	Bayer Uerdingen
23 September 1978
FC Schalke 04	3 – 2	VfB Stuttgart
SV Werder Bremen	2 – 3	Eintracht Frankfurt
FC Bayern Munich	4 – 5	VfL Osnabrück
Borussia Mönchengladbach	6 – 1	Arminia Hannover
Eintracht Trier	0 – 1	1. FC Kaiserslautern
SV Darmstadt 98	2 – 1	Preußen Münster
FC Augsburg	1 – 3	1. FC Nürnberg
Borussia Neunkirchen	0 – 0	Borussia Dortmund	(AET)
VfR Wormatia Worms	1 – 1	Hertha BSC	(AET)
Eintracht Braunschweig	1 – 0	SG Ellingen-Bonefeld
Fortuna Düsseldorf	3 – 0	VfR Heilbronn
Hannover 96	1 – 3	Alemannia Aachen
Tennis Borussia Berlin	3 – 3	VfR 1910 Bürstadt	(AET)
SV Südwest Ludwigshafen	4 – 2	Viktoria Köln
SSV Ulm 1846	4 – 2	FSV Frankfurt
Kickers Offenbach	3 – 0	ESV Ingolstadt
SC Herford	0 – 3	Holstein Kiel
SV Waldhof Mannheim	7 – 0	VfL Neustadt / Weinstraße
KSV Baunatal	3 – 0	Göttingen 05
FC St. Pauli	1 – 2	TuS Neuendorf
24 September 1978
Freiburger FC	2 – 2	1. FC Bocholt	(AET)
Westfalia Herne	2 – 3	1. FC Köln
FC 08 Homburg	4 – 2	FK Pirmasens
SC Freiburg	2 – 0	FC Tailfingen
OSV Hannover	0 – 3	Bayer 04 Leverkusen
SpVgg Bayreuth	6 – 0	Melsunger FV
Eintracht Wirges	1 – 7	Fortuna Köln
FC Gütersloh	1 – 1	Karlsruher SC	(AET)
Rot-Weiß Oberhausen	3 – 2	Fortuna Düsseldorf II

==== Replays ====
3 October 1978
Borussia Dortmund	2 – 0	Borussia Neunkirchen
VfR 1910 Bürstadt	3 – 4	Tennis Borussia Berlin	(PSO)
Karlsruher SC	3 – 0	FC Gütersloh
1. FC Bocholt	3 – 2	Freiburger FC	(AET)
7 November 1978
Hertha BSC	2 – 0	VfR Wormatia Worms

=== Third round ===
29 November 1978
Tennis Borussia Berlin	0 – 2	1. FC Nürnberg
1 December 1978
1. FC Köln	3 – 2	Eintracht Braunschweig	(AET)
Fortuna Düsseldorf	2 – 1	Alemannia Aachen
2 December 1978
Hertha BSC	2 – 0	Borussia Mönchengladbach
FC 08 Homburg	0 – 0	VfL Bochum	(AET)
MSV Duisburg	2 – 1	SV Waldhof Mannheim
Borussia Dortmund	6 – 1	Kickers Offenbach
Eintracht Frankfurt	4 – 1	KSV Baunatal
Bayer Uerdingen	2 – 1	FC Schalke 04
SV Darmstadt 98	1 – 5	SSV Ulm 1846
SV Südwest Ludwigshafen	2 – 1	1. FC Kaiserslautern
Holstein Kiel	5 – 2	Karlsruher SC
VfL Osnabrück	2 – 1	Fortuna Köln
Bayer 04 Leverkusen	1 – 0	SpVgg Bayreuth
TuS Neuendorf	3 – 1	1. FC Bocholt	(AET)
3 December 1978
Rot-Weiß Oberhausen	1 – 1	SC Freiburg	(AET)

==== Replays ====
26 December 1978
SC Freiburg	2 – 3	Rot-Weiß Oberhausen	(PSO)
6 January 1979
VfL Bochum	1 – 0	FC 08 Homburg

=== Round of 16 ===
27 April 1979
MSV Duisburg	0 – 1	Fortuna Düsseldorf
Hertha BSC	2 – 0	1. FC Köln	(AET)
Borussia Dortmund	1 – 3	Eintracht Frankfurt
SV Südwest Ludwigshafen	1 – 1	SSV Ulm 1846	(AET)
1. FC Nürnberg	7 – 1	Holstein Kiel
Bayer Uerdingen	4 – 2	VfL Bochum
Rot-Weiß Oberhausen	1 – 0	VfL Osnabrück
TuS Neuendorf	1 – 4	Bayer 04 Leverkusen

==== Replay ====
8 May 1979
SSV Ulm 1846	0 – 1	SV Südwest Ludwigshafen

=== Quarter-finals ===
26 May 1979
1. FC Nürnberg	2 – 0	SV Südwest Ludwigshafen
Hertha BSC	6 – 0	Bayer Uerdingen
Fortuna Düsseldorf	2 – 1	Bayer 04 Leverkusen
Eintracht Frankfurt	2 – 1	Rot-Weiß Oberhausen

=== Semi-finals ===
6 June 1979
Fortuna Düsseldorf	4 – 1	1. FC Nürnberg	(AET)
Hertha BSC	2 – 1	Eintracht Frankfurt

=== Final ===
23 June 1979
16:00 CET

Hertha BSC	0–1 (a.e.t.)	Fortuna Düsseldorf
	Report	Seel 116'

Niedersachsenstadion, Hanover
Attendance: 56,000
Referee: Günter Linn (Altendiez)
