= Landesliga Bayern =

- Founded: 1945 (as a Level 2 league) 1963 (as a Level 3 league)
- Country: Germany
- State: Bavaria
- Divisions: 5
- Number of clubs: 91
- Level on pyramid: Level 6
- Promotion to: Bayernliga
- Relegation to: Bezirksliga
- Current champions: TSV Kornburg; 1. FC Geesdorf; SpVgg SV Weiden; SV Erlbach; TSV 1861 Nördlingen (2021–22)

The Landesliga Bayern sits at step 6 of the German football league system and is the third highest level in the Bavarian football league system, below the Bayernliga and organised in five regional divisions. The current Landesligas were formed in 1963, when the Bundesliga was established. From 2012, when the Regionalliga Bayern was established, the Landesligas were expanded from three to five divisions.

Previous to that, from 1945 to 1950, the Landesliga Bayern existed as a tier-two league below the Oberliga Süd.

== Overview ==
=== Landesliga Bayern 1945 to 1950 ===
From 1945 to 1950, the Bayernliga was called Landesliga Bayern. It was then the second tier of Southern German Football.

The league was established after the Second World War, consisting of nine clubs, with the league winner promoted to the Oberliga Süd. After its first season, 1945–46, it expanded to two divisions, north and south, with eleven clubs each. At the end of season, the two league champions played for the Bavarian title and Oberliga promotion. In 1947–48, each division had 13 clubs.

In its last two seasons, 1948–49 and 1949–50, the league returned to a single division format. In 1948–49, it consisted of 16 clubs with the top two teams earning promotion. In 1949–50, 14 clubs were in the league and the best five teams earned entry to the newly formed 2. Oberliga Süd, which became the second tier in Southern Germany. The remaining nine clubs plus seven promoted teams formed the new Amateurliga Bayern, now the third tier.

Alongside the Landesliga Bayern, four other regional Landesligas existed as the second tier below the Oberliga Süd, these being:

- Landesliga Hessen
- Landesliga Nordbaden
- Landesliga Südbaden
- Landesliga Württemberg

=== Landesligas from 1963 to 2012 ===
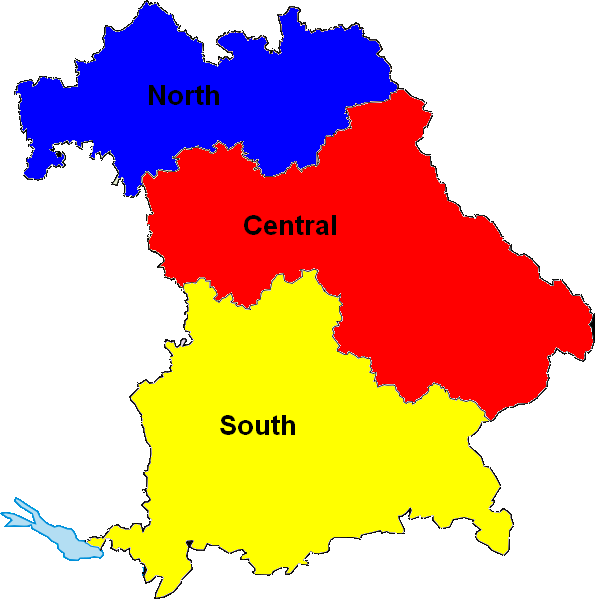
The Landesligas from 1963 to 2012.

After the inception of the three Landesligas in 1963 the winners of these leagues were automatically promoted to the Bayernliga. The runners-up faced a relegation play-off with the team of the Bayernliga that is placed just above the relegation zone, usually the 15th placed team unless the league held more or less than the desired number of 18 teams, for a final promotion spot. Since the start of the promotion play-offs in 1981, Landesliga Süd had won the extra spot 17 times, Landesliga Mitte 8 times and Landesliga Nord only 5 times. In 1985, 1994, 1996 and 2003 additional spots were available on top of the usual four.

The German word Landesliga can be pretty literally translated as State League.

The three Landesligas cover the following areas:

- Landesliga Bayern-Süd: Bavarian Swabia and Upper Bavaria
- Landesliga Bayern-Mitte: Upper Palatinate, Middle Franconia and Lower Bavaria
- Landesliga Bayern-Nord: Lower Franconia and Upper Franconia

From 1988 to 2012 the seven Bezirksoberligas were set below the Landesligas, covering the above-mentioned seven Bezirke. The winners of those gained promotion, the runners-up faced a promotion play-off for a number of promotion spot which vary from season to season. Previous to that, the Bezirksligas were set below the Landesligas, with the slight fluctuations in the number of leagues.

Only four teams in Bavaria have never dropped down to Landesliga level, these being FC Bayern Munich, TSV 1860 Munich, 1. FC Nürnberg and FC Augsburg, with the SpVgg Fürth, now SpVgg Greuther Fürth, being by far the most prominent club to have played in any of the three Landesligas, having three German championships to their name (1914, 1926, 1929).

Since 1980, the reserve teams of Landesliga clubs are permitted to enter the league system. Previous to that, they had to compete in separate reserve leagues, with only teams in the Bayernliga and above being permitted to enter their reserve teams in league football.

=== Landesligas since 2012 ===
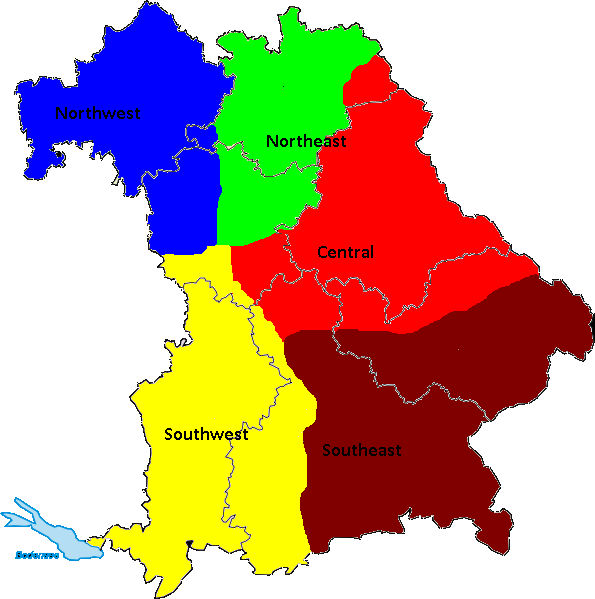
The Landesligas from 2012 onwards.

The Bavarian football federation decided on drastic changes to the league system from 2012 onwards. With the introduction of the Regionalliga Bayern from 2012 to 2013, it placed two Bayernligas, north and south, below the new league as the new fifth tier of the German league system. Below those, five Landesligas instead of the existing three were set, which would be geographically divided to limit travel and increase the number of local derbies.

The five new leagues were:

- Landesliga Bayern-Nordost
- Landesliga Bayern-Nordwest
- Landesliga Bayern-Mitte
- Landesliga Bayern-Südost
- Landesliga Bayern-Südwest

The clubs in these leagues were made up from Landesliga clubs who failed to qualify for the Bayernliga, a set number of Bezirksoberliga clubs and, through a promotion round, the Bezirksliga champions.

== League champions ==
=== Landesliga Bayern: 1945 to 1950 ===
Season	Champions	Runners–up
1945–46	1. FC Bamberg	Jahn Regensburg
1946–47	FC Wacker München	FC Bayern Hof
1947–48	BC Augsburg	1. FC Bamberg
1948–49	Jahn Regensburg	SpVgg Fürth
1949–50	1. FC Bamberg	FC Bayern Hof

=== Landesligas from 1963 to 2012 ===
Season	Landesliga Süd	Landesliga Mitte	Landesliga Nord
1963–64	TSG Augsburg	SpVgg Weiden	FV Würzburg 04
1964–65	SpVgg Kaufbeuren	1. FC Nürnberg II	FC Bayreuth
1965–66	MTV Ingolstadt	SSV Jahn Regensburg	SpVgg Hof
1966–67	FC Bayern Munich II	ESV Nürnberg-West	VfB Coburg
1967–68	SpVgg Kaufbeuren	FC Passau	FC Münchberg
1968–69	MTV Ingolstadt	SpVgg Vohenstrauss	FC Bayreuth
1969–70	FC Memmingen	FC Herzogenaurach	FV Würzburg 04
1970–71	SC Fürstenfeldbruck	ASV Neumarkt	FC Kronach
1971–72	BSC Sendling	ASV Herzogenaurach	FC Bayreuth
1972–73	FC Bayern Munich II	TSV Roth	VfB Coburg
1973–74	SpVgg Kaufbeuren	ASV Neumarkt	ATS Kulmbach
1974–75	VfR Neuburg	FC Amberg	1. FC Bamberg
1975–76	TSV 1860 Rosenheim	SpVgg Plattling	1. FC Haßfurt
1976–77	MTV Ingolstadt	FC Herzogenaurach	TSV Trebgast
1977–78	SB/DJK Rosenheim	FC Vilshofen	TSV Hirschaid
1978–79	TSV Ampfing	FC Herzogenaurach	VfB Helmbrechts
1979–80	SC Fürstenfeldbruck	1. FC Nürnberg II	VfL Frohnlach
1980–81	SpVgg Unterhaching	FC Vilshofen	1. FC Bamberg
1981–82	FC Wacker München	TSV Straubing	VfB Coburg
1982–83	TSV Eching	SSV Jahn Regensburg	FC Bayern Hof
1983–84	ESV Ingolstadt	1. FC Nürnberg II	1. FC Schweinfurt 05
1984–85	SC Fürstenfeldbruck	SpVgg Weiden	SV Heidingsfeld
1985–86	TSV Großhadern	FC Amberg	FC Schweinfurt 05
1986–87	FC Wacker München	TSV Vestenbergsgreuth	FC Kronach
1987–88	SV Türk Gücü München	SpVgg Weiden	FC Bayern Hof
1988–89	SpVgg Starnberg	SpVgg Plattling	VfB Helmbrechts
1989–90	TSV Eching	SSV Jahn Regensburg	Kickers Würzburg
1990–91	TSV Schwaben Augsburg	SpVgg Fürth	SC 08 Bamberg
1991–92	SpVgg Starnberg	FC Passau	VfL Frohnlach
1992–93	Wacker Burghausen	SpVgg Plattling	VfB Helmbrechts
1993–94	SV Türk Gücü München	Jahn Forchheim	FC Bayern Hof
1994–95	TSV 1860 Rosenheim	SG Quelle Fürth	SC Weismain
1995–96	TSV 1860 Munich II	SG Post/Süd Regensburg	SpVgg Stegaurach
1996–97	TSV 1860 Rosenheim	1. SC Feucht	Kickers Würzburg
1997–98	TSV Schwaben Augsburg	SC 04 Schwabach	SpVgg Bayreuth
1998–99	FC Kempten	SSV Jahn Regensburg	FV Würzburg 04
1999–2000	FC Ismaning	ASV Neumarkt	1. FC Sand
2000–01	Falke Markt Schwaben	SpVgg Greuther Fürth II	SpVgg Bayreuth
2001–02	SC Fürstenfeldbruck	SG Post/Süd Regensburg	TSV Gerbrunn
2002–03	FC Memmingen	SpVgg Landshut	FV Würzburg 04
2003–04	MTV Ingolstadt	1. FC Bad Kötzting	VfL Frohnlach
2004–05	Wacker Burghausen II	SG Quelle Fürth	FV Würzburg 04
2005–06	SV Heimstetten	SpVgg Weiden	SpVgg Bayern Hof
2006–07	FC Kempten	SpVgg Ansbach	FC Schweinfurt 05
2007–08	TSV Buchbach	FSV Erlangen-Bruck	VfL Frohnlach
2008–09	TSV 1860 Rosenheim	SV Schalding-Heining	SV Memmelsdorf
2009–10	SV Heimstetten	Freier TuS Regensburg	Würzburger FV
2010–11	SB/DJK Rosenheim	SC Eltersdorf	VfL Frohnlach
2011–12	Wacker Burghausen II	SpVgg Landshut	Kickers Würzburg

=== Five divisions: since 2012 ===
Season	Landesliga Nordost	Landesliga Nordwest	Landesliga Mitte	Landesliga Südost	Landesliga Südwest
2012–13	SpVgg SV Weiden	SV Erlenbach	TSV Bogen	SV Pullach	FC Pipinsried
2013–14	TSV Neudrossenfeld	SpVgg Ansbach	1. FC Bad Kötzting	TSV Dachau	TSV Landsberg
2014–15	1. SC Feucht	DJK Don Bosco Bamberg	SpVgg Ruhmannsfelden	SV Kirchanschöring	TSV Kottern
2015–16	ASV Neumarkt	SpVgg Ansbach	DJK Ammerthal	FC Ismaning	FC Gundelfingen
2016–17	TSV Kornburg	1. FC Schweinfurt 05 II	DJK Gebenbach	TuS Holzkirchen	TSV Schwaben Augsburg
2017–18	ATSV Erlangen	TSV Abtswind	SSV Jahn Regensburg II	Türkgücü-Ataspor Munich	TSV 1861 Nördlingen
2018–19	FC Eintracht Bamberg	TSV Karlburg	SV Donaustauf	TSV 1880 Wasserburg	TSV Landsberg
2019–20	No champions. Season suspended by COVID-19 pandemic in Germany and later extended to 2021				
2020–21	1. SC Feucht	Vatan Spor Aschaffenburg	ASV Neumarkt	VfB Hallbergmoos	FC Gundelfingen
2021–22	TSV Kornburg	1. FC Geesdorf	SpVgg SV Weiden	SV Erlbach	TSV 1861 Nördlingen

Source:"The Bavarian Landesligas" (in German). Das deutsche Fußball-Archiv.
