= TSV Roth =

- Full name: Turn- und Sportverein 1859 Roth e. V.
- Founded: 1859
- Dissolved: 2008
- League: defunct
- 2007–08: Bezirksoberliga Mittelfranken (VI), 9th

The TSV Roth is a defunct German association football club from the town of Roth, Bavaria.

The club's most successful era was in the 1970s when it spent a season in the tier three Bayernliga. In 2008 the club merged with SC Roth 1952 to form TSG 08 Roth.

== History ==
For most of its history the club has been a non-descript amateur side in local Bavarian football. The club's most successful era began in 1970 when it earned promotion to the tier four Landesliga Bayern-Mitte after a championship in the Bezirksliga Mittelfranken-Süd. Roth immediately became a top side in this league, finishing fourth in its first season there. A second place followed in 1972 and a league championship the season after. The later earned the club promotion to the Bayernliga, the third tier of the German football league system in Bavaria.

TSV spend the 1973–74 season in the Bayernliga but finished last and was immediately related again, never to return to this level again.

Back in the Landesliga the club could not perform on the same level as before the promotion, instead constantly struggling against relegation. Four seasons at this level followed in which a thirteenth place in 1977 was the club's best result but relegation back to the Bezirksliga followed the year after. The club earned promotion to the Bezirksoberliga Mittelfranken for a season in 1990, a league introduced in 1988, after runners-up finish in the Bezirksliga Mittelfranken-Süd. Between 1999 and 2001 the club dropped even further, to the Kreisliga, but made a recovery after three seasons there.

The club experienced a revival in the last few seasons of its existence, earning promotion to the Bezirksoberliga Mittelfranken in 2006 and immediately becoming a top side in this league. After the merger in 2008 the new club, TSG Roth, inheritated the old club's league place.

== Honours ==
The club's honours:

- Landesliga Bayern-Mitte
  - Champions: 1973
  - Runners-up: 1972
- Bezirksliga Mittelfranken-Süd
  - Champions: 1970, 2006
  - Runners-up: 1990, 2005

== Final seasons ==
The final season-by-season performance of the club:

Season	Division	Tier	Position
1999–2000			
2000–01	Kreisliga		↑
2001–02	Bezirksliga Mittelfranken-Süd	VII	7th
2002–03	Bezirksliga Mittelfranken-Süd	VII	10th
2003–04	Bezirksliga Mittelfranken-Süd	VII	4th
2004–05	Bezirksliga Mittelfranken-Süd	VII	2nd
2005–06	Bezirksliga Mittelfranken-Süd	VII	1st ↑
2006–07	Bezirksoberliga Mittelfranken	VI	5th
2007–08	Bezirksoberliga Mittelfranken	VI	9th

- With the introduction of the Bezirksoberligas in 1988 as the new fifth tier, below the Landesligas, all leagues below dropped one tier. With the introduction of the Regionalligas in 1994 and the 3. Liga in 2008 as the new third tier, below the 2. Bundesliga, all leagues below dropped one tier. With the establishment of the Regionalliga Bayern as the new fourth tier in Bavaria in 2012 the Bayernliga was split into a northern and a southern division, the number of Landesligas expanded from three to five and the Bezirksoberligas abolished. All leagues from the Bezirksligas onwards were elevated one tier.

=== Key ===
↑ Promoted	↓ Relegated
