= SC 04 Schwabach =

German football club

- Full name: Sportclub 04 Schwabach e.V.
- Founded: 1996
- Ground: Sportpark an der Nördlinger Straße
- Capacity: 4,000
- Chairman: Heinz Rabe
- Manager: Alexander Maul
- League: Landesliga Bayern-Nordost (VI)
- 2016–17: Landesliga Bayern-Nordost (VI), 9th
Home colours	Away colours

The SC 04 Schwabach is a German association football club from Schwabach, suburb of the city of Nuremberg, Bavaria.

The club was established in 1996, when TSV 04 Schwabach merged with 1. SC Schwabach to form SC 04 Schwabach. Of those two clubs, TSV has been the more successful side, having spent 13 seasons in the Fußball-Bayernliga between 1946 and 1963. After the merger, the new club managed to reach this league level again in 1998 and spent another seven seasons there until 2005.

Apart from football, the club also offers other sports like boxing and tennis.

== History ==
=== TSV 04 Schwabach ===
TSV 04 Schwabach was formed in 1904 as ATV 04 Schwabach, as a working class gymnastics club and renamed to TSV 04 in 1927. Its working class affiliation caused it to be outlawed in 1933, when the Nazis came to power. It was however reformed in 1946. It absorbed three other clubs during its existence, in 1927, 1946 and 1985.

The club was admitted to the northern division of the Landesliga Bayern in 1946 and played there for two seasons, until a league restructuring forced it to drop a tier.

Schwabach returned to Bavarias highest league in 1951, now the Amateruliga Bayern, finishing third in its first year there. After two seasons, the league was split once more in a southern and a northern division, with TSV entering the later. The club lasted for another two seasons but than suffered relegation in 1955.

The side made an immediate return to the Bayernliga from the 2nd Amateurliga in 1956, spending another seven seasons at this level. A fifth place in its first season back was the club's best result in this period and it generally out of relegation trouble.

In 1963, with the establishment of the Bundesliga, the Bayernliga was reduced to a single division once more and Schwabach missed the cut in eleventh place to enter the new league.

The club was grupped in the new tier four Landesliga Bayern-Mitte instead, but lasted for only two seasons at this level. It made a return to the Landesliga in 1968 and spent another four seasons in the league but was relegated again in 1972, this time more permanently. It took the side until 1984 to make a return to the league and then for only three seasons.

TSV became a founding member of the new tier six Bezirksoberliga Mittelfranken in 1988, where it was soon joined by local rival DJK Schwabach. After four seasons at this level, the club won the league championship in 1992 and earned promotion.

The club returned to the Landesliga in 1992, now as a much stronger side. It came close to returning to the Bayernliga when it finished second in the league in 1995–96, the club's last season, but lost 0–4 to TSV Aindling in the promotion round.

In February 1996, the members of TSV and 1. SC decided to proceed with a merger, which was formally decided upon on 19 April 1996.

=== 1. SC Schwabach ===
The origins of 1. SC Schwabach date back to 1897, when it was formed as Athletenclub Germannia. After a merger with the Athletenclub Attila in 1898 and a renaming to Athletenclub Schwabach the club received the name it carried up until the merger in 1908.

For the most part living in the shadow of TSV and DJK, 1. SC did not reach the Bezirksoberliga Mittelfranken until the final year of the club's existence, and then only to finish on a relegation rank in 1996.

=== SC 04 Schwabach ===
The new club, taking up TSV 04's place in the Landesliga came an equal second in the league in its first year, but lost to Jahn Regensburg in the necessary decider. It made up for this loss in the following year, when it won the league championship and earned promotion.

Sticking with TSV's tradition of delivering its best performance in its first year in the Bayernliga, SC 04 finished third in the league in 1998–99. The club gradually declined from there, coming 14th in 2002–03, recovering in the following season to come ninth but falling to relegation in 2005, when it came 16th.

Back in the Landesliga Bayern-Mitte, the club finished 19th the following year and suffered relegation to the Bezirksoberliga, where it played in the following years. At the end of the 2011–12 season the team qualified directly for the newly expanded Landesliga after finishing third in the Bezirksoberliga.

The team lasted for only one season in the Landesliga before being relegated back to the Bezirksliga in 2013 where it spent the next three seasons until being promoted back up in 2016.

== Honours ==
The club's honours:

=== League ===
- 2nd Amateurliga Mittelfranken Süd
  - Champions: 1956
- Landesliga Bayern-Mitte
  - Champions: 1998
  - Runners-up: 1996
- Bezirksoberliga Mittelfranken
  - Champions: 1992
- Bezirksliga Mittelfranken 2
  - Champions: 2016

=== Cup ===
- Mittelfranken Cup
  - Winners: 2004, 2005
  - Runners-up: 2000, 2002

== Recent seasons ==
The recent season-by-season performance of the club:

Season	Division	Tier	Position
1999–2000	Bayernliga	IV	9th
2000–01	Bayernliga	IV	12th
2001–02	Bayernliga	IV	10th
2002–03	Bayernliga	IV	14th
2003–04	Bayernliga	IV	9th
2004–05	Bayernliga	IV	16th ↓
2005–06	Landesliga Bayern-Mitte	V	19th ↓
2006–07	Bezirksoberliga Mittelfranken	VI	3rd
2007–08	Bezirksoberliga Mittelfranken	VI	6th
2008–09	Bezirksoberliga Mittelfranken	VII	6th
2009–10	Bezirksoberliga Mittelfranken	VII	2nd
2010–11	Bezirksoberliga Mittelfranken	VII	11th
2011–12	Bezirksoberliga Mittelfranken	VII	3rd ↑
2012–13	Landesliga Bayern-Mitte	VI	17th ↓
2013–14	Bezirksliga Mittelfranken 2	VII	7th
2014–15	Bezirksliga Mittelfranken 2	VII	3rd
2015–16	Bezirksliga Mittelfranken 2	VII	1st ↑
2016–17	Landesliga Bayern-Nordost	VI	9th

- With the introduction of the Bezirksoberligas in 1988 as the new fifth tier, below the Landesligas, all leagues below dropped one tier. With the introduction of the Regionalligas in 1994 and the 3. Liga in 2008 as the new third tier, below the 2. Bundesliga, all leagues below dropped one tier. With the establishment of the Regionalliga Bayern as the new fourth tier in Bavaria in 2012 the Bayernliga was split into a northern and a southern division, the number of Landesligas expanded from three to five and the Bezirksoberligas abolished. All leagues from the Bezirksligas onward were elevated one tier.

↑ Promoted	↓ Relegated
