= FSV Erlangen-Bruck =

German football club

- Full name: Fußball- und Sportverein Erlangen-Bruck e.V.
- Founded: 1916
- Ground: Sportanlage des FSV Erlangen-Bruck
- Capacity: 1,000
- Chairman: Reinhard Heydenreich
- Manager: Thomas Roka
- League: Landesliga Bayern-Nordost (VI)
- 2019–21: Landesliga Bayern-Nordost, 9th of 18
Home colours	Away colours

The FSV Erlangen-Bruck is a German association football club from the suburb of Bruck in the city of Erlangen, Bavaria.

== History ==
The club was formed on 15 May 1916, during the First World War, under the name of 1. FC Markt Bruck.

For most of its existence, the football department played on local level in the Bavarian region of Middle Franconia. The club came close to Landesliga (IV) promotion when it finished second in the Bezirksliga Mittelfranken-Nord in 1971, after having been promoted to this league the year before. The club remained in the Bezirksliga for a number of seasons without being able to archive quite so well again and eventually was relegated again.

In 1992, the FSV regained its Bezirksliga status once more. It finished in the upper half of the table in the following seasons, gaining promotion to the Bezirksoberliga Mittelfranken in 1996 on the strength of a second place in the league. The club spent eight seasons in the Bezirksoberliga before winning the league in 2004 and gaining promotion to the Landesliga Bayern-Mitte for the first time.

In the Landesliga, the club performed well, too, archiving a fifth place in its first season. The following two seasons saw the club finishing third both times. Bayernliga promotion was finally achieved when the club won the Landesliga in 2008. After a 29-year absence, Bayernliga football returned therefore to the city of Erlangen. The last club from the city to play at this level was the BSC Erlangen in 1979.

The club established itself reasonably well in the new league, finishing in fifth place in 2008–09 and eighth in the following year. After the promotion of local rival SC Eltersdorf to the Bayernliga in 2011 the two clubs began to hold merger talks in November 2011. The club made negative headlines when it encountered financial trouble in 2011. Bruck averted insolvency in December 2011, caused by outstanding social security payments and wages, when it had to take up a €220,000 credit. The club announced that it would have to cut the budget of the football department. After initially proceeding with their Regionalliga Bayern licence application the club opted not to apply for a place in this league in April 2012 and instead remain in the Bayernliga, with the club's chairman Manfred Hopfengärtner stepping down. After a sixteenth place in 2014–15 the club had to enter the relegation round where it lost to 1. FC Sand and was relegated.

== Honours ==
The club's honours:

=== League ===
- Landesliga Bayern-Mitte (V)
  - Champions: 2008
- Bezirksoberliga Mittelfranken (VI)
  - Champions: 2004, 2009^{‡}
  - Runners-up: 2002
- Bezirksliga Mittelfranken-Nord
  - Runners-up: 1971, 1996, 2008^{‡}
- A-Klasse Mittelfranken
  - Champions: 1970, 1992
- B-Klasse Mittelfranken
  - Champions: 1987

=== Cup ===
- Mittelfranken Cup
  - Winner: 2000

=== Youth ===
- Bavarian Under 15 championship
  - Runners-up: 2011
- ^{‡} Reserve team

== Recent managers ==
Recent managers of the club:

Manager	Start	Finish
Ulrich Pechtold	1 July 2005	30 April 2007
Gerd Klaus	1 July 2008	30 June 2012
Normann Wagner	1 July 2012	30 June 2021
Thomas Roka	1 July 2021	present

== Recent seasons ==
The recent season-by-season performance of the club:

=== FSV Erlangen-Bruck ===
Season	Division	Tier	Position
1999–2000	Bezirksoberliga Mittelfranken	VI	4th
2000–01	Bezirksoberliga Mittelfranken	VI	4th
2001–02	Bezirksoberliga Mittelfranken	VI	2nd
2002–03	Bezirksoberliga Mittelfranken	VI	5th
2003–04	Bezirksoberliga Mittelfranken	VI	1st ↑
2004–05	Landesliga Bayern-Mitte	V	5th
2005–06	Landesliga Bayern-Mitte	V	3rd
2006–07	Landesliga Bayern-Mitte	V	3rd
2007–08	Landesliga Bayern-Mitte	V	1st ↑
2008–09	Bayernliga	V	5th
2009–10	Bayernliga	V	8th
2010–11	Bayernliga	V	11th
2011–12	Bayernliga	V	11th
2012–13	Bayernliga Nord	V	13th
2013–14	Bayernliga Nord	V	14th
2014–15	Bayernliga Nord	V	16th ↓
2015–16	Landesliga Bayern-Nordost	VI	10th
2016–17	Landesliga Bayern-Nordost	VI	

=== FSV Erlangen-Bruck II ===
Season	Division	Tier	Position
1999–2000			
2000–01			
2001–02			
2002–03			
2003–04	Kreisklasse Erlangen-Forchheim Mitte	IX	1st ↑
2004–05	Kreisliga Erlangen-Forchheim	VIII	4th
2005–06	Kreisliga Erlangen-Forchheim	VIII	2nd ↑
2006–07	Bezirksliga Mittelfranken-Nord	VII	10th
2007–08	Bezirksliga Mittelfranken-Nord	VII	2nd ↑
2008–09	Bezirksoberliga Mittelfranken	VII	1st ↑
2009–10	Landesliga Bayern-Mitte	VI	14th
2010–11	Landesliga Bayern-Mitte	VI	14th
2011–12	Landesliga Bayern-Mitte	VI	10th
2012–13	Landesliga Bayern-Nordost	VI	20th ↓
2013–14	Bezirksliga Mittelfranken	VII	19th ↓
2014–15	Kreisliga Erlangen/Pegnitzgrund 1	VIII	16th ↓
2015–16	Kreisklasse Erlangen/Pegnitzgrund 1	IX	6th
2016–17	Kreisklasse Erlangen/Pegnitzgrund 1	IX	

- With the introduction of the Bezirksoberligas in 1988 as the new fifth tier, below the Landesligas, all leagues below dropped one tier. With the introduction of the Regionalligas in 1994 and the 3. Liga in 2008 as the new third tier, below the 2. Bundesliga, all leagues below dropped one tier. With the establishment of the Regionalliga Bayern as the new fourth tier in Bavaria in 2012 the Bayernliga was split into a northern and a southern division, the number of Landesligas expanded from three to five and the Bezirksoberligas abolished. All leagues from the Bezirksligas onwards were elevated one tier.

↑ Promoted	↓ Relegated
