= SG Quelle Fürth =

German football club

- Full name: SG Quelle Fürth im TV 1860 e.V.
- Founded: 1973
- Ground: Gustav-Schickedanz-Sportfeld
- Capacity: 7,000
- Manager: Patrick Frühwald
- League: Landesliga Bayern-Nordost (VI)
- 2015–16: 3rd
| Home colours | Away colours |

The SG Quelle Fürth is a German football club from the city of Fürth in Bavaria.

== History ==
The club was formed as the football section of the athletics club TV 1860 Fürth on 1 June 1973. The club's name, SG Quelle, refers to the fact that it has a strong connection with the Quelle company and originated out of the company's still existing Sunday League team BSG Quelle Kickers.

The club was part of the lower amateur leagues in Middle Franconia until 1988, when it won promotion from the Bezirksliga Mittelfranken-Süd to the Landesliga Bayern-Mitte (IV). After four seasons where it struggled for survival in this league, SG Quelle was relegated back down, now to the Bezirksoberliga Mittelfranken in 1992. 1991 saw the arrival of Dieter Lieberwirth as the club's manager, a former long-term player of the 1. FC Nürnberg, a position he held until 2002, when he returned to Nürnberg.

The club only spent one season in the BOL before returning to the Landesliga. A better performance there saw it finish seventh there in 1993–94, taking out the league title the season after. Promoted to the Bayernliga, it finished second in this league, behind fellow promoted team SC Weismain. Both earned a place in the Regionalliga Süd for the following year. Fürth as the second placed team had to play-off against the runners-up from the Oberliga Hessen, Viktoria Aschaffenburg and from the Oberliga Baden-Württemberg, VfB Stuttgart II, to do so, defeating both teams.

The club played for one season in the same league as its mighty neighbors, 1. FC Nürnberg and SpVgg Greuther Fürth but from there their ways lay apart, the later two returning to the 2. Bundesliga while Quelle was relegated back to the Bayernliga.

The next two Bayernliga seasons saw good performances by the club, finishing second in 1998 and 1999. In 1998, it missed out on promotion to the SC Pfullendorf. The later earned them a promotion back to the Regionalliga, this time by finishing ahead of the SV Sandhausen and the SG Hoechst in a promotion round. However, the club could again not survive at this level and returned to the Oberliga the next season.

From 2000 to 2003, SG Quelle played at this level before being relegated once more, now back to the Landesliga.

A runners-up spot in 2004 proofed not enough to earn promotion back to the Bayernliga but the season after, the league could be won and Quelle won promotion once more. Again, for only one season, the club being straight relegated again.

The 2006–07 season saw the club handed straight down to the Bezirksoberliga, where it, true to its unsteady past, earned promotion straight back up.

Back in the Landesliga for the 2008–09 season, the club struggled at the lower end of the table and a 14th-place finish, on equal points with 15th placed SV 73 Nürnberg-Süd, meant it had to go into post-season relegation matches once more. Quelle won 1–0 and was present in Landesliga in 2009–10 but suffered another relegation, back to the Bezirksoberliga.

At the end of the 2011–12 season the team qualified directly for the newly expanded Landesliga after finishing second in the Bezirksoberliga.

== Honours ==
The club's honours:

=== League ===
- Bayernliga (IV)
  - Runners-up: (3) 1996, 1998, 1999
- Landesliga Bayern-Mitte (V)
  - Champions: (2) 1995, 2005
  - Runners-up: 2004
- Bezirksoberliga Mittelfranken (V)
  - Champions: 1993
  - Runners-up: 2008, 2012
- Bezirksliga Mittelfranken-Nord
  - Runners-up: 1998
- Bezirksliga Mittelfranken-Süd
  - Runners-up: 1987

=== Cup ===
- Mittelfranken Cup
  - Winners: 1999
  - Runners-up: 2006

== Recent managers ==
Recent managers of the club:

| Manager | Start | Finish |
|---|---|---|
| Dieter Lieberwirth | 1 July 1991 | 30 June 2002 |
| Franz Weber | 1 July 2001 | January 2002 |
| Reinhard Hofmann | January 2002 | October 2006 |
| Paul Hesselbach | October 2006 | June 2007 |
| Petr Skarabela | July 2007 | June 2008 |
| Norbert Hütter | July 2008 | 2010 |
| Thomas Adler | 2010 | 30 June 2015 |
| Patrick Frühwald | 1 July 2015 | present |

== Recent seasons ==
The recent season-by-season performance of the club:

| Season | Division | Tier | Position |
|---|---|---|---|
| 1999–2000 | Regionalliga Süd | III | 16th ↓ |
| 2000–01 | Bayernliga | IV | 9th |
| 2001–02 | Bayernliga | IV | 8th |
| 2002–03 | Bayernliga | IV | 15th ↓ |
| 2003–04 | Landesliga Bayern-Mitte | V | 2nd |
| 2004–05 | Landesliga Bayern-Mitte | V | 1st ↑ |
| 2005–06 | Bayernliga | IV | 17th ↓ |
| 2006–07 | Landesliga Bayern-Mitte | V | 17th ↓ |
| 2007–08 | Bezirksoberliga Mittelfranken | VI | 2nd ↑ |
| 2008–09 | Landesliga Bayern-Mitte | VI | 14th |
| 2009–10 | Landesliga Bayern-Mitte | VI | 17th ↓ |
| 2010–11 | Bezirksoberliga Mittelfranken | VII | 3rd |
| 2011–12 | Bezirksoberliga Mittelfranken | VII | 2nd ↑ |
| 2012–13 | Landesliga Bayern-Nordost | VI | 4th |
| 2013–14 | Landesliga Bayern-Nordost | VI | 4th |
| 2014–15 | Landesliga Bayern-Nordost | VI | 7th |
| 2015–16 | Landesliga Bayern-Nordost | VI | 3rd |
| 2016–17 | Landesliga Bayern-Nordost | VI | |

- With the introduction of the Bezirksoberligas in 1988 as the new fifth tier, below the Landesligas, all leagues below dropped one tier. With the introduction of the Regionalligas in 1994 and the 3. Liga in 2008 as the new third tier, below the 2. Bundesliga, all leagues below dropped one tier. With the establishment of the Regionalliga Bayern as the new fourth tier in Bavaria in 2012 the Bayernliga was split into a northern and a southern division, the number of Landesligas expanded from three to five and the Bezirksoberligas abolished. All leagues from the Bezirksligas onwards were elevated one tier.

| ↑ Promoted | ↓ Relegated |
