= SpVgg Jahn Forchheim =

German football club

- Full name: Sportvereinigung Jahn Forchheim e.V.
- Founded: 1904
- Ground: Jahn-Park
- Capacity: 1,000
- Chairman: Gunter Bierfelder
- Manager: Michael Hutzler
- League: Landesliga Bayern-Nordwest
- 2015–16: Bayernliga Nord (V), 16th (relegated)
Home colours	Away colours

The SpVgg Jahn Forchheim is a German association football club from the town of Forchheim, Bavaria. Forchheim is located in Upper Franconia but the club competes in the football leagues of neighbouring Middle Franconia. Apart from football, the club also offers other sports like tennis, badminton and volleyball.

The club's greatest success came in 1994, when it earned promotion to the tier-four Fußball-Bayernliga for the first time. After six seasons at this level in which the side always finished in the top half of the table, Jahn decided to voluntarily withdraw from the league in 2000.

== History ==
The origins of the club date back to 1904, when TV Jahn Forchheim was formed. In 1924, Sportvereinigung Forchheim was established. Both clubs merged in 1947 to form the current club.

Jahn earned promotion to the tier-four Landesliga Bayern-Mitte in 1964, a league formed the previous year, but lasted for only one season before dropping down to the Bezirksliga again. In 1971, the club returned to the Landesliga, a league it would spend 25 out of a possible 49 seasons in from 1963 to 2012. Jahn spend seven consecutive seasons in the Landesliga until dropping down again in 1978. Promoted back up again for another stint of six seasons, it dropped to the Bezirksliga for a year again in 1985–86. In this era, three fourth places were the club's best result.

From 1986, Jahn spend eight seasons again in the Landesliga, which culminated in a league championship in 1993–94 and promotion to the Bayernliga for the first time.

In the Bayernliga, Jahn Forchheim established itself in the upper half of the table, finishing in ninth spot in its first two seasons. In the following two, the club improved further, achieving its best result in the league in 1997–98, when it came fourth. A sixth and an eighth place followed after that until 1999–2000. At the end of this season the club was forced, for financial reasons, to withdraw the team from the Bayernliga to the Kreisliga.

The club, after this, quickly worked its way back up through the league system, winning promotion to the Bezirksliga Mittelfranken-Nord in 2002, followed by a championship in this league in 2003.

Jahn won promotion to the Bezirksoberliga Mittelfranken in 2003, a league it would play in for six seasons from 2003 to 2006 and, again, from 2007 to 2010.

The club made a return to the Landesliga for a season in 2006–07 but dropped down again immediately. After three seasons in the Bezirksoberliga, the club returned to the Landesliga, earning its sixth promotion to the league in 2010. At the end of the 2011–12 season the club qualified directly for the newly expanded Bayernliga after finishing eighth in the Landesliga.

The club finished second in its league in 2012–13 but declined the opportunity to play in the promotion round to the Regionalliga, passing this option on to third placed TSV Großbardorf instead. The following season Jahn finished third in the league, applying for a Regionalliga licence but being rejected. After another third place in 2014–15 the club finished 16th the following season, lost to Würzburger Kickers II in the relegation play-off and dropped down to the Landesliga.

== Honours ==
The club's honours:

=== League ===
- Bayernliga Nord
  - Runners-up: 2013
- Landesliga Bayern-Mitte
  - Champions: 1994
- Bezirksoberliga Mittelfranken
  - Champions: 2006, 2010
- Bezirksliga Mittelfranken-Nord
  - Champions: 1964, 1986, 2003

=== Cup ===
- Mittelfranken Cup
  - Winners: 1998

== Recent managers ==
Recent managers of the club:

Manager	Start	Finish
Roland Seitz	?	30 June 2000
Alois Reinhardt	?	?
Michael Hutzler	1 July 2010	Present

== Recent seasons ==
The recent season-by-season performance of the club:

Season	Division	Tier	Position
1999–2000	Bayernliga	IV	8th ↓
2000–01			
2001–02			
2002–03	Bezirksliga Mittelfranken-Nord	VII	1st ↑
2003–04	Bezirksoberliga Mittelfranken	VI	6th
2004–05	Bezirksoberliga Mittelfranken	VI	4th
2005–06	Bezirksoberliga Mittelfranken	VI	1st ↑
2006–07	Landesliga Bayern-Mitte	V	19th ↓
2007–08	Bezirksoberliga Mittelfranken	VI	4th
2008–09	Bezirksoberliga Mittelfranken	VII	3rd
2009–10	Bezirksoberliga Mittelfranken	VII	1st ↑
2010–11	Landesliga Bayern-Mitte	VI	13th
2011–12	Landesliga Bayern-Mitte	VI	8th ↑
2012–13	Bayernliga Nord	V	2nd
2013–14	Bayernliga Nord	V	3rd
2014–15	Bayernliga Nord	V	3rd
2015–16	Bayernliga Nord	V	16th ↓
2016–17	Landesliga Bayern-Nordwest	VI	

- With the introduction of the Bezirksoberligas in 1988 as the new fifth tier, below the Landesligas, all leagues below dropped one tier. With the introduction of the Regionalligas in 1994 and the 3. Liga in 2008 as the new third tier, below the 2. Bundesliga, all leagues below dropped one tier. With the establishment of the Regionalliga Bayern as the new fourth tier in Bavaria in 2012 the Bayernliga was split into a northern and a southern division, the number of Landesligas expanded from three to five and the Bezirksoberligas abolished. All leagues from the Bezirksligas onwards were elevated one tier.

↑ Promoted	↓ Relegated
