= Landesliga Bayern-Mitte =

- Founded: 1963
- Folded: 2012
- Country: Germany
- State: Bavaria
- Level on pyramid: Level 6
- Promotion to: Bayernliga
- Relegation to: Bezirksoberliga Mittelfranken; Bezirksoberliga Niederbayern; Bezirksoberliga Oberpfalz
- Last champions: SpVgg Landshut (2011–12)

The Landesliga Bayern-Mitte (English: State league Bavaria-Central) was the sixth tier of the German football league system in southern Bavaria. Until the introduction of the 3. Liga in 2008, it was the fifth tier of the league system, until the introduction of the Regionalligas in 1994 the fourth tier.

The winner of the Landesliga-Mitte automatically qualified for the Bayernliga, the runners-up needed to compete with the runners-up of the other four Landesligas and the 15th placed teams of the Bayernligas for another promotion spot.

The league was disbanded in 2012, when the Regionalliga Bayern was introduced as the new fourth tier of the German league system in Bavaria. Below this league, the Bayernliga was expanded to two divisions while the number of state leagues grew from three to five divisions. A new Landesliga Bayern-Mitte was formed but the territory it now covers varies from the old league, with the clubs from northern Middle Franconia and Upper Palatinate as well as the clubs from southern Lower Bavaria now playing in other leagues.

== Overview ==
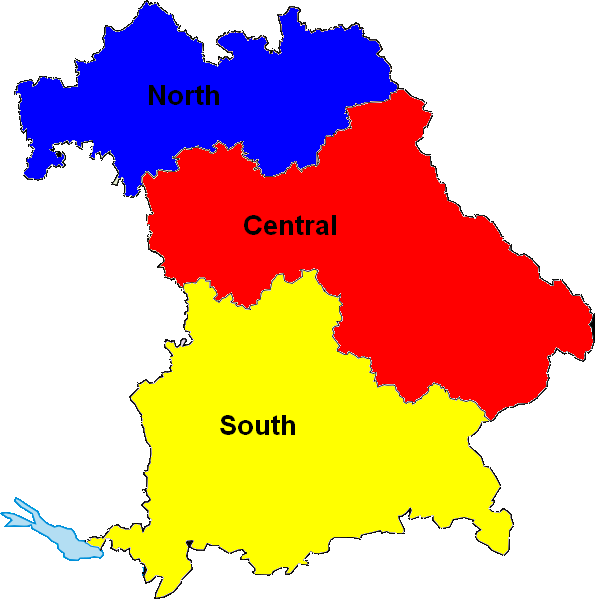
The Landesligas from 1963 to 2012

The Landesligen in Bayern were formed in 1963, in place of the 2nd Amateurligas, which operated below the Bayernliga until then. In the region of the Landesliga Mitte, the 2nd Amateurligen were split into three groups, Niederbayern, Oberpfalz and Mittelfranken. The league was formed from eighteen clubs, six of them from the Amateurligas (III) and twelve from the 2nd Amateurligas (IV).

In the first eighteen seasons, up until 1980, only the league champions were promoted to the Bayernliga. This was altered in 1981, when the three Landesliga runners-up were given the opportunity to earn promotion, too, via a promotion round. The Bavarian football association actually stipulates in its rules and regulations that every league champion has to be promoted, unless it declines to do so, and every runners-up has to have the opportunity to earn promotion, too.

Below the league, the Bezirksligas were set as the fifth tier of league football, until 1988, when the Bezirksoberligas were formed. In the first year, three teams were promoted from the Bezirksligas, one from each region; from 1966, it was four clubs. The Landesliga Mitte was fed by the three Bezirksoberligen of Mittelfranken, Oberpfalz and Niederbayern from 1988 onwards. The winner of those were automatically promoted, the runners-up played-off for another promotion spot with the 15th placed team of Landesliga to determine the winner of the last available spot in the Landesliga. The Landesliga Mitte is the only one of the three Bavarian Landesligas to have had three Bezirksoberligas as feeder leagues, the other two only have two each.

For the most part of its history, the league has operated on a strength of eighteen clubs, only occasionally diverting from this when the number of teams relegated from the Bayernliga to it was more than one. With the change in the league system in 1994 and 2008, the introduction of the Regionalliga and the 3. Liga, there were two automatic promotion places available to each of the Landesligen in those seasons.

=== Disbanding ===
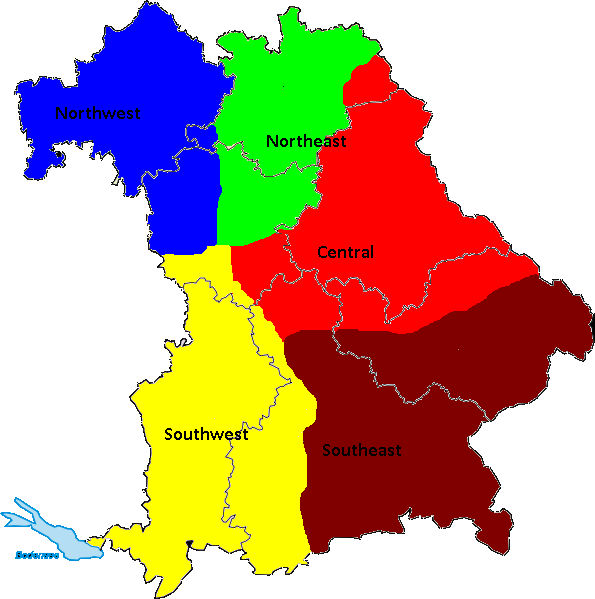
The Landesligas from 2012 onwards.

The Bavarian football federation carried out drastic changes to the league system at the end of the 2011–12 season. With the already decided introduction of the Regionalliga Bayern from 2012–13, it also placed two Bayernligas below the new league as the new fifth tier of the German league system. Below those, five Landesligas instead of the existing three were set, which would be geographically divided to limit travel and increase the number of local derbies.

The clubs from the Landesliga Bayern-Mitte joined the following leagues:

- Champions and runners-up: Promotion round to the Regionalliga, winners to the Regionalliga, losers to the Bayernliga.
- Teams placed 3rd to 8th: Directly qualified to the Bayernliga.
- Teams placed 9th to 15th: Promotion round to the Bayernliga, winners to the Bayernliga, losers to the Landesliga.
- Teams placed 16th or worse: Directly qualified to the Landesliga.

== Founding members ==
When the league was formed in 1963 as the new fourth tier of the Bavarian league system in Middle Franconia, Upper Palatinate and Lower Bavaria, in place of the 2nd Amateurligas, it consisted of the following eighteen clubs from the following leagues:

- From the Amateurliga Südbayern
  - SpVgg Weiden
  - 1. FC Amberg
  - SpVgg Landshut
- From the Amateurliga Nordbayern
  - ESV Nürnberg-West
  - TSV 04 Schwabach
  - ASV Nürnberg-Süd
- From the 2nd Amateurliga Mittelfranken-Nord
  - TV Erlangen
  - 1. FC Hersbruck
  - SpVgg Erlangen
- From the 2nd Amateurliga Mittelfranken-Süd
  - 1. FC Nuremberg II
  - FC Stein
  - ASV Neumarkt
- From the 2nd Amateurliga Niederbayern
  - SV Saal
  - FC Dingolfing
  - SpVgg Deggendorf
- From the 2nd Amateurliga Oberpfalz
  - TuS Rosenberg
  - FC Maxhütte-Haidhof
  - 1. FC Schwarzenfeld

The clubs in the two Amateurligas placed seventh or better were admitted to the new Amateurliga Bayern, all others went to the new Landesligas. The top-three teams in the four regional 2nd Amateurligas were each admitted to the Landesliga.

== Top-three of the Landesliga ==
The following teams have finished in the top-three in the league:

**Season**	Champions	**Runners-up**	**Third**
1963–64	SpVgg Weiden	ESV Nürnberg-West	FC Stein
1964–65	1. FC Nuremberg II	1. FC Amberg	FC Dingolfing
1965–66	SSV Jahn Regensburg	1. FC Passau	SpVgg Landshut
1966–67	ESV Nürnberg-West	TuS Rosenberg	FC Stein
1967–68	1. FC Passau	TuS Rosenberg	SpVgg Vohenstrauß
1968–69	SpVgg Vohenstrauß	1. FC Amberg	FC Herzogenaurach
1969–70	FC Herzogenaurach	ASV Neumarkt	ASV Herzogenaurach
1970–71	ASV Neumarkt	TSV Straubing	FC Schwandorf
1971–72	ASV Herzogenaurach	TSV Roth	SC Zwiesel
1972–73	TSV Roth	1. FC Amberg	TSV Straubing
1973–74	ASV Neumarkt	SpVgg Plattling	SpVgg Deggendorf
1974–75	1. FC Amberg	FC Herzogenaurach	SpVgg Vohenstrauß
1975–76	SpVgg Plattling	SpVgg Vohenstrauß	FC Herzogenaurach
1976–77	FC Herzogenaurach	TSV Straubing	1. FC Nuremberg II
1977–78	FC Vilshofen	ASV Herzogenaurach	TSV Südwest Nürnberg
1978–79	FC Herzogenaurach	ASV Herzogenaurach	FC Schwandorf
1979–80	1. FC Nuremberg II	ASV Herzogenaurach	SSV Jahn Regensburg
1980–81	FC Vilshofen	TSV Straubing	SSV Jahn Regensburg
1981–82	TSV Straubing	**SpVgg Landshut**	SSV Jahn Regensburg
1982–83	SSV Jahn Regensburg	1. FC Amberg	ASV Burglengenfeld
1983–84	1. FC Nuremberg II	FSV Bad Windsheim	1. FC Amberg
1984–85	SpVgg Weiden	**SpVgg Plattling**	1. FC Amberg
1985–86	1. FC Amberg	FSV Bad Windsheim	TSV Vestenbergsgreuth
1986–87	TSV Vestenbergsgreuth	FSV Bad Windsheim	FC Vilshofen
1987–88	SpVgg Weiden	1. FC Miltach	SpVgg Fürth
1988–89	SpVgg Plattling	SpVgg Fürth	1. FC Passau
1989–90	SSV Jahn Regensburg	1. FC Passau	SpVgg Fürth
1990–91	SpVgg Fürth	1. FC Nuremberg II	1. FC Miltach
1991–92	1. FC Passau	**SpVgg Landshut**	1. FC Kötzting
1992–93	SpVgg Plattling	BSC Erlangen	TSV 04 Schwabach
1993–94	Jahn Forchheim	**1. FC Amberg**	SpVgg Weiden
1994–95	SG Quelle Fürth	**SpVgg Weiden**	SG Post/Süd Regensburg
1995–96	SG Post/Süd Regensburg	TSV 04 Schwabach	TuS Landshut-Berg
1996–97	1. SC Feucht	SSV Jahn Regensburg	SC 04 Schwabach
1997–98	SC 04 Schwabach	**1. FC Nuremberg II**	SSV Jahn Regensburg
1998–99	SSV Jahn Regensburg	**SpVgg Ansbach**	ASV Neumarkt
1999–2000	ASV Neumarkt	1. FC Kötzting	SG Post/Süd Regensburg
2000–01	SpVgg Greuther Fürth II	Linde Schwandorf	ASV Vach
2001–02	SG Post/Süd Regensburg	SpVgg Landshut	ASV Cham
2002–03	SpVgg Landshut	**1. FC Passau**	ASV Neumarkt
2003–04	1. FC Kötzting	SG Quelle Fürth	DJK Vilzing
2004–05	SG Quelle Fürth	ASV Neumarkt	SpVgg Landshut
2005–06	SpVgg Weiden	TuS Regensburg	FSV Erlangen-Bruck
2006–07	SpVgg Ansbach	SV Schalding-Heining	FSV Erlangen-Bruck
2007–08	FSV Erlangen-Bruck	**SV Seligenporten**	DJK Vilzing
2008–09	SV Schalding-Heining	SpVgg Landshut	ASV Neumarkt
2009–10	Freier TuS Regensburg	TSV Neustadt/Aisch	SSV Jahn Regensburg II
2010–11	SC Eltersdorf	SSV Jahn Regensburg II	SpVgg Landshut
2011–12	SpVgg Landshut	**SV Schalding-Heining**	**SSV Jahn Regensburg II**

- Promoted teams in **bold**.
- The Bavarian football association requires deciders to be played when two teams are on equal points at the end of the season to determine promotion/relegation. Championship deciders were necessary in the following years:
- For first place:
  - 1964: SpVgg Weiden defeated ESV Nürnberg-West.
  - 1970: FC Herzogenaurach defeated ASV Neumarkt.
  - 1976: SpVgg Plattling defeated SpVgg Vohenstrauß.
  - 1990: SSV Jahn Regensburg defeated 1. FC Passau.
  - 1991: SpVgg Fürth defeated 1. FC Nuremberg II.
- For second place:
  - 1989: SpVgg Fürth defeated 1. FC Passau.
  - 1997: SSV Jahn Regensburg defeated SC 04 Schwabach 3–2.
  - 2006: TuS Regensburg defeated FSV Erlangen-Bruck 3–2 aet.
  - 2007: SV Schalding-Heining defeated FSV Erlangen-Bruck 1–0.
  - 2009: SpVgg Landshut defeated ASV Neumarkt 1–0.

=== Multiple winners ===
The following clubs have won the league more than once:

**Club**	**Wins**	**Years**
SpVgg Weiden	4	1964, 1985, 1988, 2006
SSV Jahn Regensburg	4	1966, 1983, 1990, 1999
ASV Neumarkt	3	1971, 1974, 2000
SpVgg Plattling	3	1976, 1989, 1993
1. FC Nuremberg II	3	1965, 1980, 1984
FC Herzogenaurach	3	1970, 1977, 1979
SpVgg Landshut	2	2003, 2012
SG Quelle Fürth	2	1995, 2005
SG Post/Süd Regensburg	2	1996, 2002
1. FC Passau	2	1968, 1992
1. FC Amberg	2	1975, 1986
FC Vilshofen	2	1978, 1981

== All-time table 1963–2012 ==
The SpVgg Landshut holds the top spot in the all-time table of the Landesliga Mitte, with the 1. FC Nuremberg II being second, 319 points behind, SpVgg Jahn Forchheim is third. The last place, number 133, goes to TSV Ergoldsbach on eight points. The 2011–12 season, the leagues last, saw three new teams in the league who had not played at this level before, SV Buckenhofen, FC Ergolding and Dergah Spor Nürnberg.

Pos.	Club	Seasons	M	W	D	L	GF	GA	P
1	SpVgg Landshut	28	922	440	199	283	1796	1341	1518
2	1. FC Nuremberg II	21	704	346	160	198	1307	853	1198
3	Jahn Forchheim	26	848	323	206	321	1442	1426	1175
4-130	127 clubs								
131	VfB Regensburg	1	30	2	6	22	24	83	12
132	TuS Grafenwöhr	1	34	2	5	27	46	120	11
133	TSV Ergoldsbach	1	34	1	5	28	28	104	8

== League placings 1988–2012 ==
The complete list of clubs and placings in the league from the 1988–89 until 2011–12 seasons:

Club	S	89	90	91	92	93	94	95	96	97	98	99	00	01	02	03	04	05	06	07	08	09	10	11	12
SpVgg Greuther Fürth ^{1}	4	2	3	1	B	B	B	R	R	R	2B	2B	2B	2B	2B	2B	2B	2B	2B	2B	2B	2B	2B	2B	2B
SSV Jahn Regensburg ^{5}	11	7	1	B	B	B	B	B	B	2	3	1	B	R	R	R	2B	R	R	B	R	3L	3L	3L	3L
1. FC Nürnberg II	21	6	6	2	6	10	6	7	4	8	2	B	B	B	B	B	B	B	B	B	B	R	R	R	R
SpVgg Greuther Fürth II	1													1	B	B	B	B	B	B	B	R	R	R	R
FSV Erlangen-Bruck	4																	5	3	3	1	B	B	B	B
SV Seligenporten	4																	6	6	4	2	B	B	B	B
SC Eltersdorf	10														12	8	7	8	5	11	15	13	5	1	B
SpVgg Landshut	27	B	5	7	2	B	B	B	B	B	B	B	B	4	2	1	B	3	4	5	4	2	4	3	1
SV Schalding-Heining	11												5	10	5	11	4	13	10	2	5	1	B	B	2
SSV Jahn Regensburg II ^{5}	6															B	B	B	B	14	8	11	3	2	3
DJK Ammerthal	3																						7	7	4
SpVgg G-W Deggendorf ^{6}	6																17		17			9	9	8	5
SpVgg Hankofen	8														13	7	9	9	15		16			4	6
ASV Neumarkt	20			15						4	4	3	1	B	B	3	5	2	11	12	6	3	13	12	7
Jahn Forchheim ^{3}	25	8	8	7	13	12	1	B	B	B	B	B	B							19				13	8
1. FC Bad Kötzting	16			10	3	8	10	12	5	14	15	5	2	9	8	5	1	B	B	B	B	B	B	11	9
FSV Erlangen-Bruck II	3																						14	14	10
TSV Neustadt/Aisch	15								13	10	16		15	14	10	13	13	10	18		9	6	2	5	11
Dergah Spor Nürnberg	1																								12
ASV Cham	27				7	11	9	15	7	12	14	14	14	13	3	9	6	12	12	8	18				13
FC Ergolding	1																								14
SV Buckenhofen	1																								15
TSV Bad Abbach	2																							6	16
SpVgg Ansbach	17	9	10	6	12	5	12	10	16		5	2	B	B	R	B	B	B	8	1	B	B	B	9	17
SV Etzentricht	6																			7	11	12	11	10	18
Freier TuS Regensburg	14										13	13	9	6	11	12	12	7	2	6	7	4	1	B	19
SpVgg Weiden ^{8}	12	B	B	B	B	B	3	2	B	B	B	B	B	B	B	B	B	B	1	B	B	B	R	R	
FC Amberg ^{2}	7																16		7	15	13	8	10	15	
FC Tegernheim	4																	16				10	15	16	
DJK Vilzing	10													11	14	14	3	4	16		3	5	8	17	
SpVgg Weiden II	2																						12	18	
FC Dingolfing	19														18		8	14	14	9	10	7	6	19	
TV Schierling	1																						16		
SG Quelle Fürth	11	12	13	9	14		7	1	B	R	B	B	R	B	B	B	2	1	B	17		14	17		
SV 73 Nürnberg-Süd ^{1}	9																					15	18		
ASC Simbach	1																					16			
ASV Vach	15							13	8	9	9	4	4	3	6	4	11	11	9	13	12	17			
1. SC Feucht	5								12	1	B	B	B	B	B	B	R	R	B	B	14	18			
SpVgg Kirchdorf	3																		13	10	17				
1. FC Schnaitach	3																15	15		16					
1. FC Miltach	16	4	4	3	4	7	13	6	10	16		9	11	16						18					
1. FC Passau	20	3	2	4	1	B	B	B	B	B	B	B	B	12	4	2	B	B	B	20					
SC 04 Schwabach	3									3	1	B	B	B	B	B	B	B	19						
FV Wendelstein	3															10	14		20						
ASV Zirndorf	11	15													7	6	10	17							
ETSV Landshut	2																	18							
TSV Kareth-Lappersdorf	4	17		13													18								
SV Neusorg	5										12	8	16		9	15									
FC Beilngries	1															16									
SV Hutthurm	8								9	6	10	7	7	8	15	17									
SV Perlesreut	1															18									
SG Post/Süd Regensburg ^{5}	11	10	8	5	11	9	5	3	1	B	B	B	3	5	1										
Linde Schwandorf	6							14	17			12	8	2	16										
SC Luhe-Wildenau	5									15	17		12	7	17										
Glück-Auf Wackersdorf	4												10	15											
TSV Rotthalmünster	1													17											
TSV Straubing	18									5	8	11	13	18											
SV Riedelhütte ^{4}	3										6	6	6												
BSC Erlangen	16				8	2	4	4	15	13	7	10	17												
TSV Ergoldsbach	1												18												
TSV Uehlfeld	1											15													
TuS Landshut-Berg	4							9	3	17		16													
DJK Schwabach	1											17													
SV Landau/Isar	6				15			8	6	7	11	18													
ESV Rangierbahnhof Nürnberg	4							11	14	11	18														
FC Schwandorf	10								11	18															
TSV 04 Schwabach	13					3	8	5	2																
TSV Velden	1								18																
1. FC Amberg ^{2}	18	B	B	B	10	4	2	B																	
SpVgg Plattling	18	1	B	B	B	1	B	16																	
TSV Katzwang	3					13	14	17																	
FC Vilshofen	16	5	11	12	5	6	11	18																	
FC Furth im Wald	1						15																		
SpVgg Deggendorf ^{6}	13	14					16																		
TSV Weißenburg	12		12	11	9	14																			
TSV Waldkirchen	1					15																			
VfB Regensburg	1					16																			
Detag Wernberg	2		15		16																				
TSV Südwest Nürnberg	2	18		14																					
ASV Auerbach	2		9	16																					
FC Aunkirchen	3	11	14																						
TV Freyung	1		16																						
SpVgg Ruhmannsfelden	2	13	17																						
TSV Pressath	4	16																							
FC Herzogenaurach	13	19																							

=== Key ===
Symbol	Key
B	Bundesliga
RL 2B	Regionalliga Süd (1963–74) 2nd Bundesliga (1974–present)
3L	3rd Liga
R	Regionalliga Süd (1994–present)
B	Bayernliga
1	League champions
Place	League
Blank	Played at a league level below this league

- S = No of seasons in league (until 2011-12)

=== Notes ===
- ^{1} In 1996, SpVgg Fürth and TSV Vestenbergsgreuth merged to form SpVgg Greuther Fürth.
- ^{2} In 1995, 1. FC Amberg was declared bankrupt and folded. A new club, FC Amberg, was formed, initially within the TV Amberg system.
- ^{3} In 2000, Jahn Forchheim withdrew from the Bayernliga to the lower amateur leagues.
- ^{4} In 2000, SV Riedelhütte withdrew from the league.
- ^{5} In 1988, Post SV Regensburg merged with TSG Süd Regensburg to form SG Post/Süd Regensburg. In 2002, SG Post/Süd Regensburg joined SSV Jahn Regensburg to become SSV Jahn Regensburg II.
- ^{6} In 2003, SpVgg Grün-Weiß Deggendorf was formed through a merger of SpVgg Deggendorf and SV Grün-Weiß Deggendorf.
- ^{7} In 1967, ASV Nürnberg-Süd merged with TSV Nürnberg to form SV 73 Nürnberg-Süd.
- ^{8} In 2011, SpVgg Weiden declared insolvency in the Regionalliga and was relegated to the Bezirksoberliga Oberpfalz.

== League records 1963–2012 ==
The league records in regards to points, wins, losses and goals for the clubs in the league were:

Record	Team	Season	Number
Most wins	SpVgg Weiden	1987-88	30
Fewest wins	FC Passau	2006-07	0
Most defeats	Freier TuS Regensburg	2011-12	33
Fewest defeats	FC Amberg	1974-75	1
Fewest defeats	SpVgg Weiden	1987-88	1
Fewest defeats	FC Passau	1991-92	1
Fewest defeats	SpVgg Plattling	1992-93	1
Most goals for	SpVgg Greuther Fürth II	2000-01	122
Fewest goals for	FC Passau	2006-07	16
Most goals against	TV 1848 Erlangen	1966-67	135
Fewest goals against	SpVgg Fürth	1990-91	22
Highest points (2 for a win)	SpVgg Weiden	1987-88	67
Lowest points (2 for a win)	SpVgg Ruhmannsfelden	1989-90	7
Highest points (3 for a win)	SpVgg Ansbach	2006-07	88
Lowest points (3 for a win)	FC Passau	2006-07	7
Lowest points (3 for a win)	Freier TuS Regensburg	2011-12	7
