= 1. SC Feucht =

German football club

- Full name: 1. Sportclub Feucht e.V.
- Founded: June 1920
- Ground: Walstadion
- Capacity: 3,500
- Chairman: Hans-Jürgen Ammon
- Manager: Florian Schlicker
- League: Bayernliga Nord (V)
- 2021–22: Bayernliga Nord, 10th of 18
Home colours	Away colours

1. SC Feucht is a German association football club from Feucht, a market town close to the city of Nuremberg, Bavaria.

The club's greatest success has been promotion to the tier-three Regionalliga Süd in 2003, where it played for two seasons before being relegated again in 2005.

== History ==
Fußball Club Feucht was established as the town's first football team in 1920 and renamed Sportclub Feucht in 1923. The club was dissolved in 1925 and 1. SC Feucht emerged as its successor in 1927.

The team played in lower-level local competition until winning its way into the Landesliga Bayern-Mitte (V) in 1995. Two years later that advance was followed by promotion to the Bayernliga (IV) and then, in 2003, to the Regionalliga Süd (III). However, the club was unable to sustain itself financially at that level and, despite finishing clear of the relegation zone, voluntarily withdrew to the Bayernliga in 2005 after beginning bankruptcy proceedings in February that year. New sponsorship briefly secured the club's position, but it again faced insolvency in March 2007. The team competed in the Landesliga Bayern-Mitte after being sent down following a 19th-place finish in 2006–07. In this league, the club struggled, too, finishing 14th and having to secure survival through a post-season decider against SC Eltersdorf, which Feucht won.

In 2008–09, the club suffered another relegation, now to the Bezirksoberliga Mittelfranken (VII). Changes in the league system in 2012 meant that the club, after a championship in the Bezirksoberliga, qualified for the promotion round to the newly expanded Bayernliga. After a first round victory over SV Buckenhofen the club was knocked out in the second round by DJK Don Bosco Bamberg and failed to qualify for the Bayernliga but earned Landesliga promotion instead. At the end of the 2013–14, Feucht was moved to the Nordost division of the Landesliga. The following season the club won the league and earned promotion back to the Bayernliga.

== Stadium ==
1. SC Feucht plays its home fixtures in the Waldstadion, which has a capacity of 3,500. In the 2007–08 season, the club had the second-worst support in its league, an average of 154 spectators per match.

== Honours ==
The club's honours:

=== League ===
- Bayernliga (IV)
  - Champions: 2003
- Landesliga Bayern-Mitte (V)
  - Champions: 1997
- Landesliga Bayern-Nordost
  - Champions (2): 2015, 2021
- Bezirksoberliga Mittelfranken
  - Champions (2): 1995, 2012

=== Cup ===
- Mittelfranken Cup
  - Runners-up: 1996, 1999, 2001

== Recent managers ==
Recent managers of the club:

Manager	Start	Finish
Roland Seitz	9 October 2001	30 June 2005
Norbert Winkler	1 July 2007	27 March 2007
Vanco Timov	26 March 2007	30 June 2008
Roland Winkler		
Klaus Mösle	1 July 2010	30 June 2017
Rainer Zietsch	1 July 2017	30 June 2018
Florian Schlicker	1 July 2018	Present

== Recent seasons ==
The recent season-by-season performance of the club:

Season	Division	Tier	Position
1999–2000	Bayernliga	IV	3rd
2000–01	Bayernliga	IV	5th
2001–02	Bayernliga	IV	14th
2002–03	Bayernliga	IV	1st ↑
2003–04	Regionalliga Süd	III	8th
2004–05	Regionalliga Süd	III	14th ↓
2005–06	Bayernliga	IV	15th
2006–07	Bayernliga	IV	19th ↓
2007–08	Landesliga Bayern-Mitte	V	14th
2008–09	Landesliga Bayern-Mitte	VI	18th ↓
2009–10	Bezirksoberliga Mittelfranken	VII	4th
2010–11	Bezirksoberliga Mittelfranken	VII	7th
2011–12	Bezirksoberliga Mittelfranken	VII	1st ↑
2012–13	Landesliga Bayern-Mitte	VI	5th
2013–14	Landesliga Bayern-Mitte	VI	14th
2014–15	Landesliga Bayern-Nordost	VI	1st ↑
2015–16	Bayernliga Nord	V	10th
2016–17	Bayernliga Nord	V	15h ↓
2017–18	Landesliga Bayern-Nordost	VI	3rd
2018–19	Landesliga Bayern-Nordost	VI	2nd
2019–21	Landesliga Bayern-Nordost	VI	1st ↑
2021–22	Bayernliga Nord	V	10th
2022–23	Bayernliga Nord	V	

- With the introduction of the Bezirksoberligas in 1988 as the new fifth tier, below the Landesligas, all leagues below dropped one tier. With the introduction of the Regionalligas in 1994 and the 3. Liga in 2008 as the new third tier, below the 2. Bundesliga, all leagues below dropped one tier. With the establishment of the Regionalliga Bayern as the new fourth tier in Bavaria in 2012 the Bayernliga was split into a northern and a southern division, the number of Landesligas expanded from three to five and the Bezirksoberligas abolished. All leagues from the Bezirksligas onwards were elevated one tier.

↑ Promoted	↓ Relegated
