= 2009 Bavarian Cup =

German Football Competition

- Founded
- 1998
- Nation
- Germany
- State
- Bavaria
- Qualifying competition for
- German Cup
- Champions 2009
- SpVgg Weiden

The 2009 Bavarian Cup was the twelfth edition of this competition, organised by the Bavarian Football Association (BFV), which was first held in 1998. The winner and runners-up were both qualified for the 2009–10 DFB-Pokal. Additionally, this year's semi-finalist, SpVgg Unterhaching, was also qualified because it finished in the top-four of the 3. Liga.

The competition was open to all senior men's football teams playing within the Bavarian football league system and the Bavarian clubs in the Regionalliga Süd (III) and 3. Liga.

== Rules and History ==
The seven Bezirke in Bavaria each play their own cup competition which in turn used to function as a qualifying to the German Cup (DFB-Pokal). Since 1998 these seven cup-winners plus the losing finalist of the region that won the previous event advance to the newly introduced Bavarian Cup, the Toto-Pokal. The two finalists of this competition advance to the German Cup. Bavarian clubs which play in the first and second Bundesliga are not permitted to take part in the event, their reserve teams however can.

The seven regional cup winners plus the finalist from last season's winners region were qualified for the first round.

== Participating clubs ==
The following eight clubs qualified for the 2009 Bavarian Cup:

| Club | League | Tier | Cup performance |
|---|---|---|---|
| SV Wacker Burghausen | 3. Liga | III | Final |
| SpVgg Weiden | Oberliga Bayern | V | Final |
| SpVgg Unterhaching | 3. Liga | III | Semi-final |
| VfL Frohnlach | Oberliga Bayern | V | Semi-final |
| TSV Aindling | Oberliga Bayern | V | First round |
| 1. FC Schweinfurt 05 | Oberliga Bayern | V | First round |
| SV Schalding-Heining | Landesliga Bayern-Mitte | VI | First round |
| SC Eltersdorf | Landesliga Bayern-Mitte | VI | First round |

== Bavarian Cup season 2008–09 ==
Teams qualified for the next round in bold.

=== Regional finals ===
| Region | Date | Winner | Finalist | Result |
|---|---|---|---|---|
| Oberbayern Cup | 21 April 2009 | SpVgg Unterhaching | **SV Wacker Burghausen** | 3–0 |
| Niederbayern Cup | 17 May 2009 | SV Schalding Heining | FC Dingolfing | 2–2 / 8–7 after pen. |
| Schwaben Cup | 29 April 2009 | TSV Aindling | TSV Rain am Lech | 3–0 |
| Oberpfalz Cup | 5 May 2009 | SpVgg Weiden | Jahn Regensburg | 2–1 |
| Mittelfranken Cup | 28 April 2009 | SC Eltersdorf | ASV Neumarkt | 2–2 / 6–5 after pen. |
| Oberfranken Cup | 29 April 2009 | VfL Frohnlach | SpVgg Selbitz | 4–2 |
| Unterfranken Cup | 29 April 2009 | 1. FC Schweinfurt 05 | FC Leinach | 2–1 |

- The runners-up of the Oberbayern Cup is the eights team qualified for the Bavarian Cup due to SpVgg Unterhaching from Oberbayern having won the Cup in the previous season.

=== First round ===
| Date | Home | Away | Result |
|---|---|---|---|
| 19 May 2009 | 1. FC Schweinfurt 05 | **SpVgg Weiden** | 0–1 |
| 20 May 2009 | SV Schalding-Heining | **SV Wacker Burghausen** | 0–3 |
| 20 May 2009 | TSV Aindling | **SpVgg Unterhaching** | 1–2 |
| 20 May 2009 | SC Eltersdorf | **VfL Frohnlach** | 0–0 / 3–4 after pen. |

=== Semi-finals ===
| Date | Home | Away | Result |
|---|---|---|---|
| 26 May 2009 | **SpVgg Weiden** | SpVgg Unterhaching | 3–3 / 10–9 after pen. |
| 26 May 2009 | VfL Frohnlach | **Wacker Burghausen** | 1–1 / 2–5 after pen. |

=== Final ===
| Date | Home | Away | Result | Attendance |
|---|---|---|---|---|
| 15 September 2009 | **SpVgg Weiden** | Wacker Burghausen | 1–0 | |

== DFB Cup 2009–10 ==
The two clubs, SpVgg Weiden and Wacker Burghausen, who qualified through the Bavarian Cup for the 2009–10 drew the following first-round opposition:

| Round | Date | Home | Away | Result | Attendance |
|---|---|---|---|---|---|
| First round | 1 August 2009 | SpVgg Weiden | Borussia Dortmund | 1–3 | 9,765 |
| First round | 1 August 2009 | Wacker Burghausen | Rot Weiss Ahlen | 1–1 / 4–5 after pen. | 2,900 |
