= 2005 Bavarian Cup =

German football tournament

- Founded
- 1998
- Nation
- Germany
- State
- Bavaria
- Qualifying competition for
- German Cup
- Champions 2005
- Jahn Regensburg

The 2005 Bavarian Cup was the eighth edition of this competition, organised by the Bavarian Football Association (BFV), which was started in 1998. It ended with the Jahn Regensburg winning the competition. Together with the finalist, FC Ingolstadt 04, both clubs were qualified for the DFB Cup 2005-06.

The competition is open to all senior men's football teams playing within the Bavarian football league system and the Bavarian clubs in the Regionalliga Süd (III).

== Rules & History ==
The seven Bezirke in Bavaria each play their own cup competition which in turn used to function as a qualifying to the German Cup (DFB-Pokal). Since 1998 these seven cup-winners plus the losing finalist of the region that won the previous event advance to the newly introduced Bavarian Cup, the Toto-Pokal. The two finalists of this competition advance to the German Cup. Bavarian clubs which play in the first or second Bundesliga are not permitted to take part in the event, their reserve teams however can. The seven regional cup winners plus the finalist from last season's winners region are qualified for the first round.

== Participating clubs ==
The following eight clubs qualified for the 2006 Bavarian Cup:

Club	League	Tier	Cup performance
Jahn Regensburg	Regionalliga Süd	III	Winner
FC Ingolstadt 04	Oberliga Bayern	IV	Final
FC Augsburg	Regionalliga Süd	III	Semi-final
VfL Frohnlach	Oberliga Bayern	IV	Semi-final
1. FC Bad Kötzting	Oberliga Bayern	IV	First round
SC 04 Schwabach	Oberliga Bayern	IV	First round
TSV Lengfeld	Bezirksoberliga Unterfranken	VI	First round
SV Etzenricht	Bezirksoberliga Oberpfalz	VI	First round

== Bavarian Cup season 2004-05 ==
Teams qualified for the next round in bold.

=== Regional finals ===
Region	Date	Winner	Finalist	Result
Oberbayern Cup	26 April 2005	FC Ingolstadt 04	FC Ismaning	1-1 / 5-2 after pen.
Niederbayern Cup	18 May 2005	1. FC Bad Kötzting	SpVgg Hankofen-Hailing	4-1
Schwaben Cup	11 May 2005	FC Augsburg	TSG Thannhausen	2-0
Oberpfalz Cup	11 May 2005	SV Etzenricht	**Jahn Regensburg**	2-1
Mittelfranken Cup	17 May 2005	SC 04 Schwabach	SC Eltersdorf	2-2 / 7-6 after pen.
Oberfranken Cup	18 May 2005	VfL Frohnlach	SpVgg Bayreuth	0-0 / 3-2 after pen.
Unterfranken Cup	17 May 2005	TSV Lengfeld	Kickers Würzburg	4-2

- The Jahn Regensburg, runners-up of the Oberpfalz Cup is the eights team qualified for the Bavarian Cup due to the club's reserve team having won the Cup in the previous season.

=== First round ===
Date	Home	Away	Result
17 May 2005	TSV Lengfeld	**FC Ingolstadt 04**	1-5
25 May 2005	1. FC Bad Kötzting	**Jahn Regensburg**	0-6
24 May 2005	SC 04 Schwabach	**VfL Frohnlach**	0-x
24 May 2005	SV Etzenricht	**FC Augsburg**	2-7

=== Semi-finals ===
Date	Home	Away	Result
1 June 2005	**FC Ingolstadt 04**	FC Augsburg	2-0
1 June 2005	VfL Frohnlach	**Jahn Regensburg**	0-3

=== Final ===
Date	Home	Away	Result	Attendance
22 July 2005	FC Ingolstadt 04	**Jahn Regensburg**	0-2	900

== DFB Cup 2005-06 ==
The two clubs, Jahn Regensburg and FC Ingolstadt 04, who qualified through the Bavarian Cup for the DFB Cup 2005-06 both were knocked out in the first round of the national cup competition:

Round	Date	Home	Away	Result	Attendance
First round	20 August 2005	FC Ingolstadt 04	1. FC Saarbrücken	1-1 / 4-5 after pen.	2,000
First round	20 August 2005	Jahn Regensburg	Alemannia Aachen	1-3 aet	4,500
