= 2003 Bavarian Cup =

German regional football competition

- Founded
- 1998
- Nation
- Germany
- State
- Bavaria
- Qualifying competition for
- German Cup
- Champions 2003
- TSV Aindling

The 2003 Bavarian Cup was the sixth edition of this competition which was started in 1998. It ended with the TSV Aindling winning the competition. Together with the finalist, TSV Gerbrunn, both clubs were qualified for the DFB Cup 2003-04.

The competition is open to all senior men's football teams playing within the Bavarian football league system and the Bavarian clubs in the Regionalliga Süd (III).

== Rules & History ==
The seven Bezirke in Bavaria each play their own cup competition which in turn used to function as a qualifying to the German Cup (DFB-Pokal). Since 1998 these seven cup-winners plus the losing finalist of the region that won the previous event advance to the newly introduced Bavarian Cup, the Toto-Pokal. The two finalists of this competition advance to the German Cup. Bavarian clubs which play in the first or second Bundesliga are not permitted to take part in the event, their reserve teams however can. The seven regional cup winners plus the finalist from last season's winners region are qualified for the first round.

== Participating clubs ==
The following eight clubs qualified for the 2003 Bavarian Cup:

Club	League	Tier	Cup performance
TSV Aindling	Oberliga Bayern	IV	Winner
TSV Gerbrunn	Oberliga Bayern	IV	Final
VfL Frohnlach	Landesliga Bayern-Nord	V	Semi-final
SV Schalding-Heining	Landesliga Bayern-Mitte	V	Semi-final
Jahn Regensburg	Regionalliga Süd	III	First round
TSV 1860 Munich II	Oberliga Bayern	IV	First round
MTV Ingolstadt	Landesliga Bayern-Süd	V	First round
ASV Zirndorf	Landesliga Bayern-Mitte	V	First round

== Bavarian Cup season 2002-03 ==
Teams qualified for the next round in bold.

=== Regional finals ===
Region	Date	Winner	Finalist	Result
Oberbayern Cup	30 April 2003	TSV 1860 Munich II	**MTV Ingolstadt**	3-0
Niederbayern Cup	7 May 2003	SV Schalding-Heining	FC Dingolfing	2-1
Schwaben Cup	7 May 2003	TSV Aindling	TSV 1861 Nördlingen	1-1 / 4-3 after pen.
Oberpfalz Cup	14 May 2003	Jahn Regensburg	SpVgg Weiden	3-0
Mittelfranken Cup	14 May 2003	ASV Zirndorf	1. FC Nuremberg II	3-2
Oberfranken Cup	13 May 2003	VfL Frohnlach	SpVgg Bayreuth	3-1
Unterfranken Cup	6 May 2003	TSV Gerbrunn	Alemannia Haibach	2-1

- The MTV Ingolstadt, runners-up of the Oberbayern Cup is the eights team qualified for the Bavarian Cup due to the FC Bayern Munich II from Oberbayern having won the Cup in the previous season.

=== First round ===
Date	Home	Away	Result
21 May 2003	**TSV Gerbrunn**	Jahn Regensburg	2-2 / 4-2 after pen.
21 May 2003	MTV Ingolstadt	**SV Schalding-Heining**	0-2
21 May 2003	**TSV Aindling**	TSV 1860 Munich II	3-3 / 4-3 after pen.
21 May 2003	ASV Zirndorf	**VfL Frohnlach**	1-1 / 4-5 after pen.

=== Semi-finals ===
Date	Home	Away	Result
31 May 2003	SV Schalding-Heining	**TSV Gerbrunn**	1-1 / 2-4 after pen.
27 May 2003	VfL Frohnlach	**TSV Aindling**	0-3

=== Final ===
Date	Home	Away	Result	Attendance
18 July 2003	**TSV Aindling**	TSV Gerbrunn	14-0	550

The reason for the one-sided result in the final can be seen in the fact that TSV Gerbrunn had withdrawn its team from the Bayernliga to the lower Bavarian amateur leagues, therefore fielding a much weaker side.

== DFB Cup 2003-04 ==
The two clubs, TSV Aindling and TSV Gerbrunn, who qualified through the Bavarian Cup for the DFB Cup 2003-04 both were knocked out in the first round of the national cup competition:

Round	Date	Home	Away	Result	Attendance
First round	30 August 2003	TSV Aindling	FC Schalke 04	0-3	6,400
First round	30 August 2003	TSV Gerbrunn	Wacker Burghausen	0-14	815
