= 2007 Bavarian Cup =

German regional football competition

- Founded
- 1998
- Nation
- Germany
- State
- Bavaria
- Qualifying competition for
- German Cup
- Champions 2007
- SV Seligenporten

The 2007 Bavarian Cup was the tenth edition of this competition, organised by the Bavarian Football Association (BFV), which was started in 1998. It ended with the SV Seligenporten winning the competition. Together with the finalist, Würzburger FV, both clubs were qualified for the DFB Cup 2007-08.

The competition is open to all senior men's football teams playing within the Bavarian football league system and the Bavarian clubs in the Regionalliga Süd (III).

== Rules & History ==
The seven Bezirke in Bavaria each play their own cup competition which in turn used to function as a qualifying to the German Cup (DFB-Pokal). Since 1998 these seven cup-winners plus the losing finalist of the region that won the previous event advance to the newly introduced Bavarian Cup, the Toto-Pokal. The two finalists of this competition advance to the German Cup. Bavarian clubs which play in the first and second Bundesliga are not permitted to take part in the event, their reserve teams however can. The seven regional cup winners plus the finalist from last season's winners region are qualified for the first round.

== Participating clubs ==
The following eight clubs qualified for the 2007 Bavarian Cup:

Club	League	Tier	Cup performance
SV Seligenporten	Landesliga Bayern-Mitte	V	Winner
Würzburger FV	Oberliga Bayern	IV	Final
TSV 1861 Nördlingen	Landesliga Bayern-Süd	V	Semi-final
FC Augsburg II	Landesliga Bayern-Süd	V	Semi-final
FC Ingolstadt 04	Regionalliga Süd	III	First round
SV Schalding-Heining	Landesliga Bayern-Mitte	V	First round
SpVgg Selbitz	Landesliga Bayern-Nord	V	First round
TSV Kareth-Lappersdorf	Bezirksoberliga Oberpfalz	VI	First round

== Bavarian Cup season 2006-07 ==
Teams qualified for the next round in bold.

=== Regional finals ===
Region	Date	Winner	Finalist	Result
Oberbayern Cup	1 May 2007	FC Ingolstadt 04	SV Raisting	4-0
Niederbayern Cup	25 April 2007	SV Schalding-Heining	1. FC Bad Kötzting	3-3 / 6-4 after pen.
Schwaben Cup	2 May 2007	TSV 1861 Nördlingen	**FC Augsburg II**	0-0 / 4-3 after pen.
Oberpfalz Cup	8 May 2007	TSV Kareth-Lappersdorf	DJK Vilzing	2-0
Mittelfranken Cup	8 May 2007	SV Seligenporten	SpVgg Greuther Fürth II	0-0 / 4-2 after pen.
Oberfranken Cup	2 May 2007	SpVgg Selbitz	VfL Frohnlach	3-2
Unterfranken Cup	8 May 2007	Würzburger FV	Alemannia Haibach	2-1

- The FC Augsburg II, runners-up of the Schwaben Cup is the eights team qualified for the Bavarian Cup due to TSG Thannhausen from Schwaben having won the Cup in the previous season.

=== First round ===
Date	Home	Away	Result
17 May 2007	SV Schalding-Heining	**FC Augsburg II**	0-5
15 May 2007	**TSV 1861 Nördlingen**	FC Ingolstadt 04	2-2 / 5-4 after pen.
17 May 2007	SpVgg Selbitz	**Würzburger FV**	1-2
16 May 2007	TSV Kareth-Lappersdorf	**SV Seligenporten**	0-2

=== Semi-finals ===
Date	Home	Away	Result
23 May 2007	**SV Seligenporten**	FC Augsburg II	3-0
23 May 2007	TSV 1861 Nördlingen	**Würzburger FV**	2-7

=== Final ===
Date	Home	Away	Result	Attendance
20 July 2007	**SV Seligenporten**	Würzburger FV	1-0	600

== DFB Cup 2007-08 ==
The two clubs, SV Seligenporten and Würzburger FV, who qualified through the Bavarian Cup for the DFB Cup 2007-08 both were knocked out in the first round of the national cup competition:

Round	Date	Home	Away	Result	Attendance
First round	5 August 2007	SV Seligenporten	Arminia Bielefeld	0-2	3,500
First round	5 August 2007	Würzburger FV	VfL Wolfsburg	0-4	11,200
