= 2001 Bavarian Cup =

German regional football competition

- Founded
- 1998
- Nation
- Germany
- State
- Bavaria
- Qualifying competition for
- German Cup
- Champions 2001
- Jahn Regensburg

The 2001 Bavarian Cup was the fourth edition of this competition which was started in 1998. It ended with the Jahn Regensburg winning the competition. Together with the finalist, Würzburger FV, both clubs were qualified for the DFB Cup 2001-02.

The competition is open to all senior men's football teams playing within the Bavarian football league system and the Bavarian clubs in the Regionalliga Süd (III).

== Rules & History ==
The seven Bezirke in Bavaria each play their own cup competition which in turn used to function as a qualifying to the German Cup (DFB-Pokal). Since 1998 these seven cup-winners plus the losing finalist of the region that won the previous event advance to the newly introduced Bavarian Cup, the Toto-Pokal. The two finalists of this competition advance to the German Cup. Bavarian clubs which play in the first or second Bundesliga are not permitted to take part in the event, their reserve teams however can. The seven regional cup winners plus the finalist from last season's winners region are qualified for the first round. It was the first time the competition had been expanded from seven to eight teams.

== Participating clubs ==
The following eight clubs qualified for the 2001 Bavarian Cup:

| Club | League | Tier | Cup performance |
|---|---|---|---|
| Jahn Regensburg | Regionalliga Süd | III | Winner |
| Würzburger FV | Oberliga Bayern | IV | Final |
| FC Bayern Munich II | Regionalliga Süd | III | Semi-final |
| 1. FC Nuremberg II | Oberliga Bayern | IV | Semi-final |
| FC Gundelfingen | Landesliga Bayern-Süd | V | First round |
| SpVgg Landshut | Landesliga Bayern-Mitte | V | First round |
| SpVgg Bayreuth | Landesliga Bayern-Nord | V | First round |
| SV Nußdorf am Inn | Bezirksliga Oberbayern-Ost | VII | First round |

== Bavarian Cup season 2000-01 ==
Teams qualified for the next round in bold.

=== Regional finals ===
| Region | Date | Winner | Finalist | Result |
|---|---|---|---|---|
| Oberbayern Cup | 8 May 2001 | FC Bayern Munich II | **SV Nußdorf am Inn** | 4-0 |
| Niederbayern Cup | 8 May 2001 | SpVgg Landshut | SpVgg Hankofen-Hailing | 3-2 |
| Schwaben Cup | 8 May 2001 | FC Gundelfingen | FC Königsbrunn | 0-0 / 4-3 after pen. |
| Oberpfalz Cup | 1 May 2001 | Jahn Regensburg | SV Hubertus Köfering | 9-0 |
| Mittelfranken Cup | 22 May 2001 | 1. FC Nuremberg II | 1. SC Feucht | 1-1 / 4-3 after pen. |
| Oberfranken Cup | 22 May 2001 | SpVgg Bayreuth | FC Lichtenfels | 2-0 |
| Unterfranken Cup | 8 May 2001 | Würzburger FV | Alemannia Haibach | 2-0 |

- The SV Nußdorf am Inn, runners-up of the Oberbayern Cup is the eights team qualified for the Bavarian Cup due to the FC Ismaning from Oberbayern having won the Cup in the previous season.

=== First round ===
| Date | Home | Away | Result |
|---|---|---|---|
| 24 May 2001 | SV Nußdorf am Inn | **Würzburger FV** | 1-3 |
| 29 May 2001 | SpVgg Landshut | **Jahn Regensburg** | 1-4 |
| 29 May 2001 | SpVgg Bayreuth | **1. FC Nuremberg II** | 3-5 |
| 29 May 2001 | FC Gundelfingen | **FC Bayern Munich II** | 1-2 |

=== Semi-finals ===
| Date | Home | Away | Result |
|---|---|---|---|
| 1 June 2001 | **Jahn Regensburg** | FC Bayern Munich II | 2-2 / 4-2 after pen. |
| 5 June 2001 | **Würzburger FV** | 1. FC Nuremberg II | 3-1 |

=== Final ===
| Date | Home | Away | Result | Attendance |
|---|---|---|---|---|
| 20 July 2001 | Würzburger FV | **Jahn Regensburg** | 0-3 | 760 |

== DFB Cup 2001-02 ==
The two clubs, Würzburger FV and Jahn Regensburg, who qualified through the Bavarian Cup for the DFB Cup 2001-02 both were knocked out in the first round of the national cup competition:

| Round | Date | Home | Away | Result | Attendance |
|---|---|---|---|---|---|
| First round | 26 August 2001 | Jahn Regensburg | Bayer Leverkusen | 0-3 | 10,500 |
| First round | 25 August 2001 | Würzburger FV | TSV 1860 München | 0-10 | 10,100 |
