= 2006 Bavarian Cup =

German regional football competition

- Founded
- 1998
- Nation
- Germany
- State
- Bavaria
- Qualifying competition for
- German Cup
- Champions 2006
- TSG Thannhausen

The 2006 Bavarian Cup was the ninth edition of this competition, organised by the Bavarian Football Association (BFV), which was started in 1998. It ended with the TSG Thannhausen winning the competition. Together with the finalist, SpVgg Bayreuth, both clubs were qualified for the DFB Cup 2006-07.

The competition is open to all senior men's football teams playing within the Bavarian football league system and the Bavarian clubs in the Regionalliga Süd (III).

== Rules & History ==
The seven Bezirke in Bavaria each play their own cup competition which in turn used to function as a qualifying to the German Cup (DFB-Pokal). Since 1998 these seven cup-winners plus the losing finalist of the region that won the previous event advance to the newly introduced Bavarian Cup, the Toto-Pokal. The two finalists of this competition advance to the German Cup. Bavarian clubs which play in the first or second Bundesliga are not permitted to take part in the event, their reserve teams however can. The seven regional cup winners plus the finalist from last season's winners region are qualified for the first round.

== Participating clubs ==
The following eight clubs qualified for the 2006 Bavarian Cup:

Club	League	Tier	Cup performance
TSG Thannhausen	Landesliga Bayern-Süd	V	Winner
SpVgg Bayreuth	Regionalliga Süd	III	Final
Jahn Regensburg	Regionalliga Süd	III	Semi-final
FC Ingolstadt 04	Oberliga Bayern	IV	Semi-final
1. FC Nürnberg II	Oberliga Bayern	IV	First round
SpVgg Landshut	Landesliga Bayern-Mitte	V	First round
SpVgg Weiden	Landesliga Bayern-Mitte	V	First round
1. FC Schweinfurt 05	Landesliga Bayern-Nord	V	First round

== Bavarian Cup season 2005-06 ==
Teams qualified for the next round in bold.

=== Regional finals ===
Region	Date	Winner	Finalist	Result
Oberbayern Cup	25 April 2006	FC Ingolstadt 04	SC Fürstenfeldbruck	1-1 / 5-4 after pen.
Niederbayern Cup	25 April 2006	SpVgg Landshut	SV Schalding-Heining	3–0
Schwaben Cup	10 May 2006	TSG Thannhausen	FC Memmingen	4–2
Oberpfalz Cup	16 May 2006	Jahn Regensburg	**SpVgg Weiden**	5–0
Mittelfranken Cup	9 May 2006	1. FC Nürnberg II	SG Quelle Fürth	3–2
Oberfranken Cup	17 May 2006	SpVgg Bayreuth	VfL Frohnlach	2–0
Unterfranken Cup	17 May 2006	1. FC Schweinfurt 05	TSV Großbardorf	2-2 / 7-6 after pen.

- The SpVgg Weiden, runners-up of the Oberpfalz Cup is the eights team qualified for the Bavarian Cup due to Jahn Regensburg from Oberpfalz having won the Cup in the previous season.

=== First round ===
Date	Home	Away	Result
24 May 2006	1. FC Schweinfurt 05	**Jahn Regensburg**	0–4
24 May 2006	**TSG Thannhausen**	SpVgg Weiden	1-1 / 4-3 after pen.
24 May 2006	SpVgg Landshut	**FC Ingolstadt 04**	2–3
24 May 2006	1. FC Nürnberg II	**SpVgg Bayreuth**	2–4

=== Semi-finals ===
Date	Home	Away	Result
6 June 2006	**TSG Thannhausen**	FC Ingolstadt 04	1-1 / 6-5 after pen.
31 May 2006	**SpVgg Bayreuth**	Jahn Regensburg	2–0

=== Final ===
Date	Home	Away	Result	Attendance
19 July 2006	**TSG Thannhausen**	SpVgg Bayreuth	2–1	600

== DFB Cup 2006-07 ==
The two clubs, TSG Thannhausen and SpVgg Bayreuth, who qualified through the Bavarian Cup for the DFB Cup 2006-07 both were knocked out in the first round of the national cup competition:

Round	Date	Home	Away	Result	Attendance
First round	9 September 2006	TSG Thannhausen	Borussia Dortmund	0–3	10,500
First round	9 September 2006	SpVgg Bayreuth	Kickers Offenbach	0–2	2,850
