= 2011–12 Bayernliga =

Bayernliga
- Season: 2011–12
- Champions: TSV 1860 Rosenheim
- Promoted: TSV 1860 Rosenheim; SpVgg Bayern Hof; SC Eltersdorf; TSV Buchbach; TSV Rain am Lech; SV Seligenporten; VfL Frohnlach; FC Eintracht Bamberg; FC Ismaning; SV Heimstetten
- Relegated: none
- Matches: 306
- Top goalscorer: Cem Ekinci (22 goals)
- Biggest home win: Eltersdorf 5–0 Schweinfurt
- Biggest away win: Rosenheim 1–5 Heimstetten
- Highest scoring: Eltersdorf 6–2 Buchbach; Unterhaching 3–5 Würzburg; Großbardorf 3–5 Eltersdorf Schweinfurt 3–5 Gersthofen
- Longest winning run: 6 games TSV 1860 Rosenheim
- Longest unbeaten run: 12 games SpVgg Bayern Hof
- Longest winless run: 12 games SpVgg Unterhaching II
- Longest losing run: 8 games TSV Gersthofen
- Highest attendance: 2,427; Schweinfurt v Würzburg
- Lowest attendance: 50: Unterhaching v Bamberg; SB Rosenheim v Aindling
- Total attendance: 131,100
- Average attendance: 428

The 2011–12 season of the Bayernliga, the highest association football league in Bavaria, was the fourth season of the league at tier five (V) of the German football league system and the 67th season overall since establishment of the league in 1945. The regular season started on 22 July 2011 and finished after 34 rounds on 19 May 2012, followed by relegation play-off games in early June. It was the last season of the league operating in a single-division format, from 2012 it will be split into a northern and a southern division, a system last in place in the 1962–63 season.

The league season was interrupted by a three-month winter break, which lasted from 27 November 2011 to 2 March 2012. It was won by TSV 1860 Rosenheim, which clinched the title in the 33rd round of the season with a 3–0 home win over SV Seligenporten. It was the first time that the club from Rosenheim won the title. Apart from Rosenheim nine other clubs from the league earned promotion to the new Fußball-Regionalliga Bayern, while no club was relegated. This was because of the introduction of the Regionalliga Bayern as the new fourth tier above the Bayernliga from 2012 and the expansion to two regional divisions. Instead, the top nine clubs gained entry to the new Regionalliga while the next six had the opportunity to also qualify for this league, having to play a promotion round with the best teams of the Landesligas. The bottom three teams in the league automatically remained at this level.

Two of the leagues clubs made negative headlines when they encountered financial trouble. FSV Erlangen-Bruck averted insolvency in December 2011, caused by outstanding social security payments and wages, when it had to take up a €220,000 credit. The club announced that it would have to cut the budget of the football department. The TSV Aindling, club officials and current and former players were raided by the German customs department in December 2011. The club is thought to have knowingly withheld social security payments. A third club, TSV Gersthofen, announced a deficit of €200,000 for its football department, with the main club providing a 10-year repayable loan to cover for it. Aindling and Gersthofen consequently decided not to apply for a Regionalliga licence.

== Qualifying modus for the 2012–13 season ==
In October 2010, another reform of the Regionalligas was decided upon. The number of leagues were now to be expanded to five, with the defunct Regionalliga Nordost to be reestablished and a Regionalliga Bayern to be established. The new system is due to come into operation in the 2012–13 season.

The Bavarian football federation was carrying out drastic changes to the league system from 2012 onwards. With the already decided introduction of the Regionalliga Bayern from 2012 to 2013, it placed two Bayernligas below the new league as the new fifth tier of the German league system. Below those, five Landesligas instead of the existing three were set, which were geographically divided to limit travel and increase the number of local derbies. This model was adopted in late April 2011. With the league reform at the end of the 2011–12 season, the Bezirksoberligas were also disbanded. Instead, the Bezirksligas took the place of the Bezirksoberligas once more below the Landesligas, as had been the case until 1988.

While it was originally thought that the Regionalliga Bayern would carry the name Bayernliga, it was later revealed that the current Bayernliga would retain this name, making it a divided league like it had already been from 1953 to 1963. The new qualification modus would see all current Bavarian Regionalliga teams qualify for the new league as well as the top nine of the Bayernliga. Additionally, the teams placed 10th to 15th entered a promotion round with the six Landesliga champions and runners-up for three more spots in the new league. Fluctuations of this formula were however possible if a Bavarian club was promoted to or relegated from the 3. Liga, which was not the case. The losers of this qualification round, nine clubs, and the Landesliga clubs placed third to eighth, 18 clubs, would all enter the new Bayernligas. The Landesliga clubs that failed to qualify for the Bayernligas would remain in one of the five new Landesligas, there would be no relegation to the Bezirksligas.

For the qualification round following the regular season this meant that the clubs placed first to ninth were directly qualified for the Regionalliga. The clubs placed tenth, eleventh and twelfth would each play one of the three Landesliga runners-up. The clubs placed 13th, 14th and 15th would each play one of the Landesliga champions. The winner of these six encounters would then advance to the next round. In this round, the winners of the first three encounters will be drawn against the winners of the second three. Depending on the number of teams entering the new Regionalliga from other leagues, all three winners of this round would qualify for the new league or further games will be necessary. All encounters were to be played in a two-game home and away format. However, since not all eligible clubs applied for a Regionalliga licence, this system was slightly altered.

The new two division Bayernliga will consist of all Bayernliga teams not qualified for the new Regionalliga plus a set number of teams qualified from the leagues below. The Landesliga champions and runners-up that failed to qualify for the Regionalliga would be directly qualified for the Bayernligas, as would the Landesliga teams placed third to eighth. The Landesliga teams placed ninth to 15th would face the seven Bezirksoberliga champions to determine the remaining available spots in the league. All match-ups will be played in European Cup format, meaning away goals count double when the aggregate score is drawn.

With the deadline for the licence applications for the new Regionalliga Bayern set for 1 April 2012, of the 18 Bayernliga clubs, 15 applied for a licence, with only TSV Gersthofen, TSV Aindling and SpVgg Unterhaching II deciding not to apply. Because of ongoing financial issues the FSV Erlangen-Bruck withdrew its Regionalliga licence application in April 2012, thereby giving one of the three Landesliga champions a bye in the first round of the Regionalliga qualification.

Location of teams in the 2011–12 Bayernliga

The league features four new clubs for the 2011–12 season:

- SB/DJK Rosenheim and TSV Gersthofen, promoted from the Landesliga Süd
- VfL Frohnlach, promoted from the Landesliga Nord
- SC Eltersdorf, promoted from the Landesliga Mitte

=== League table ===
Pos	Team	Pld	W	D	L	GF	GA	GD	Pts	Promotion or qualification
1	TSV 1860 Rosenheim (C, P)	34	20	10	4	72	34	+38	70	Promotion to Regionalliga Bayern
2	Bayern Hof (P)	34	19	7	8	55	27	+28	64	Promotion to Regionalliga Bayern
3	SC Eltersdorf (P)	34	17	7	10	70	50	+20	58	Promotion to Regionalliga Bayern
4	TSV Buchbach (P)	34	16	8	10	65	49	+16	56	Promotion to Regionalliga Bayern
5	TSV Rain am Lech (P)	34	16	7	11	50	44	+6	55	Promotion to Regionalliga Bayern
6	SV Seligenporten (P)	34	14	10	10	51	44	+7	52	Promotion to Regionalliga Bayern
7	VfL Frohnlach (P)	34	13	12	9	62	46	+16	51 (Note: Fro 1–1 Bam; Bam 2–2 Fro)	Promotion to Regionalliga Bayern
8	FC Eintracht Bamberg (P)	34	15	6	13	62	57	+5	51	Promotion to Regionalliga Bayern
9	FC Ismaning (P)	34	13	8	13	52	47	+5	47	Promotion to Regionalliga Bayern
10	TSV Großbardorf	34	13	7	14	49	65	−16	46	Qualification to promotion playoffs
11	FSV Erlangen-Bruck	34	11	11	12	37	49	−12	44	Declined promotion (Note: TSV Aindling and Gersthofen declined to apply for a Regionalliga licence, FSV Erlangen-Bruck withdrew its application)
12	Würzburger FV	34	12	7	15	55	66	−11	43	Qualification to promotion playoffs
13	FC Schweinfurt 05	34	10	11	13	58	70	−12	41	Qualification to promotion playoffs
14	SB/DJK Rosenheim	34	8	15	11	53	59	−6	39	Qualification to promotion playoffs
15	SV Heimstetten (O, P)	34	10	8	16	56	67	−11	38	Qualification to promotion playoffs
16	TSV Aindling	34	8	8	18	41	58	−17	32	Declined promotion
17	TSV Gersthofen	34	7	6	21	49	82	−33	27	Declined promotion
18	SpVgg Unterhaching II	34	6	8	20	35	58	−23	26	Ineligible for promotion (Note: Reserve teams of Regionalliga clubs are ineligible for Regionalliga promotion.)

Source: bfv.de
Rules for classification: 1st points; 2nd head-to-head points; 3rd head-to-head goal difference; 4th head-to-head goals scored; 5th head-to-head goals scored away from home (only if two teams are tied in points); 6th goal difference; 7th number of goals scored; 8th wins; 9th goals scored away from home; 10th drawing of lots
(C) Champions; (O) Play-off winners; (P) Promoted

=== Top goalscorers ===
The top goal scorers for the season:

Rank	Player	Club	Goals
1	(Germany) Cem Ekinci	SpVgg Bayern Hof	22
2	(Germany) Peter Heyer	FC Eintracht Bamberg	21
3	(Germany) Steffen Krautschneider	Würzburger FV	15
4	(Germany) Bernd Rosinger	SV Seligenporten	14
4	(Germany) Florian Wolf	FC Ismaning	14
4	(Germany) Onur Kaya	SB/DJK Rosenheim	14

== Play-offs ==
=== Promotion round to the Regionalliga ===
==== First round ====
The following games were scheduled to determine which clubs from the Bayernliga and Landesliga who would qualify for the Regionalliga, to be played in a home-and-away format: The games of the first round were played on 23 and 26 May, the second round on 2 and 6 June 2012:

Game	Team 1	Agg.	Team 2	Leg 1	Leg 2
1	BC Aichach (S8)	2–1	TSV Großbardorf (B10)	1–0	1–1
2	SpVgg Selbitz (N3)	1–6	Würzburger FV (B12)	0–3	1–3
3	SV Schalding-Heining (M2)	1–1 (a)	FC Schweinfurt 05 (B13)	1–1	0–0
4	FC Augsburg II (S2)	2–1	SB/DJK Rosenheim (B14)	1–1	1–0
5	SpVgg Landshut (M1)	6–7	SV Heimstetten (B15)	1–0	5–7 (a.e.t.)
6	Würzburger Kickers (N1)	N/A	none	bye	

==== Second round ====
The winners of this round are qualified for the Regionalliga, the losers for the Bayernliga:

Game	Team 1	Agg.	Team 2	Leg 1	Leg 2
A	BC Aichach (S8)	1–4	Würzburger Kickers (N1)	0–3	1–1
B	SV Heimstetten (B15)	2–2 (a)	Würzburger FV (B12)	1–0	1–2
C	FC Augsburg II (S2)	3–0	FC Schweinfurt 05 (B13)	0–0	3–0 (a.e.t.)

=== Promotion round to the Bayernliga ===
==== First round ====
The following games were scheduled to determine which clubs from the Landesliga and Bezirksoberliga qualify for the Bayernliga, to be played in a home-and-away format. The clubs were subdivided into seven regional groups. The games of the first round were played on 24 and 28 May, the second round on 3 and 7 June 2012:

Game	Team 1	Agg.	Team 2	Leg 1	Leg 2
Group 1 – Game 1	ASV Rimpar (UF)	5–5 (a)	FT Schweinfurt (N13)	3–1	2–4 (a.e.t.)
Group 1 – Game 2	TG Höchberg (N10)	2–5	Alemannia Haibach (N9)	0–1	2–4
Group 2 – Game 1	SV Friesen (OF)	3–3 (a)	ASV Hollfeld (N14)	3–1	0–2
Group 2 – Game 2	1. FC Burgkunstadt (N15)	2–3	TSV Neudrossenfeld (N11)	2–0	0–3 (a.e.t.)
Group 3 – Game 1	1. SC Feucht (MF)	5–5 (a)	SV Buckenhofen (M15)	2–2	3–3
Group 3 – Game 2	DJK Don Bosco Bamberg (N12)	3–2	TSV Neustadt/Aisch (M11)	1–1	2–1
Group 4 – Game 1	FC Amberg (OP)	5–1	1. FC Bad Kötzting (M9)	2–0	3–1
Group 4 – Game 2	ASV Cham (M13)	1–4	Dergah Spor Nürnberg (M12)	1–2	0–2
Group 5 – Game 1	FC Affing (SW)	2–2 (a)	TSV Landsberg (S10)	0–0	2–2
Group 5 – Game 2	FC Gundelfingen (S13)	3–0	FC Pipinsried (S11)	0–0	3–0
Group 6 – Game 1	SC Eintracht Freising (OB)	2–4	SC Fürstenfeldbruck (S9)	1–1	1–3
Group 6 – Game 2	SV Pullach (S15)	6–2	TSV Eching (S14)	3–0	3–2
Group 7 – Game 1	ETSV 09 Landshut (NB)	1–3	FC Ergolding (M14)	0–2	1–1
Group 7 – Game 2	TSV Bad Abbach (M16)	2–3	FC Unterföhring (S12)	0–1	2–2

==== Second round ====
The winners of this round are qualified for the Bayernliga, the losers for the Landesliga:

Game	Team 1	Agg.	Team 2	Leg 1	Leg 2
Group 1	ASV Rimpar (UF)	4–5	Alemannia Haibach (N9)	2–2	2–3
Group 2	ASV Hollfeld (N14)	2–1	TSV Neudrossenfeld (N11)	1–0	1–1
Group 3	1. SC Feucht (MF)	4–8	DJK Don Bosco Bamberg (N12)	2–6	2–2
Group 4	FC Amberg (OP)	4–2	Dergah Spor Nürnberg (M12)	1–1	3–1
Group 5	FC Affing (SW)	2–2 (a)	FC Gundelfingen (S13)	0–0	2–2
Group 6	SV Pullach (S15)	0–2	SC Fürstenfeldbruck (S9)	0–1	0–1
Group 7	FC Ergolding (M14)	0–1	FC Unterföhring (S12)	0–0	0–1

=== Key ===
- (B) denotes Bayernliga club
- (S) denotes Landesliga Süd club
- (M) denotes Landesliga Mitte club
- (N) denotes Landesliga Nord club
- (OF) denotes Bezirksoberliga Oberfranken club
- (UF) denotes Bezirksoberliga Unterfranken club
- (MF) denotes Bezirksoberliga Mittelfranken club
- (NB) denotes Bezirksoberliga Niederbayern club
- (OP) denotes Bezirksoberliga Oberpfalz club
- (OB) denotes Bezirksoberliga Oberbayern club
- (SW) denotes Bezirksoberliga Schwaben club
