= 2002 Bavarian Cup =

German regional football competition

- Founded
- 1998
- Nation
- Germany
- State
- Bavaria
- Qualifying competition for
- German Cup
- Champions 2002
- FC Bayern Munich II

The 2002 Bavarian Cup was the fifth edition of this competition which was started in 1998. It ended with the FC Bayern Munich II winning the competition. Together with the finalist, Jahn Regensburg, both clubs were qualified for the DFB Cup 2002-03.

The competition is open to all senior men's football teams playing within the Bavarian football league system and the Bavarian clubs in the Regionalliga Süd (III).

== Rules & History ==
The seven Bezirke in Bavaria each play their own cup competition which in turn used to function as a qualifying to the German Cup (DFB-Pokal). Since 1998 these seven cup-winners plus the losing finalist of the region that won the previous event advance to the newly introduced Bavarian Cup, the Toto-Pokal. The two finalists of this competition advance to the German Cup. Bavarian clubs which play in the first or second Bundesliga are not permitted to take part in the event, their reserve teams however can. The seven regional cup winners plus the finalist from last season's winners region are qualified for the first round.

== Participating clubs ==
The following eight clubs qualified for the 2002 Bavarian Cup:

Club	League	Tier	Cup performance
FC Bayern Munich II	Regionalliga Süd	III	Winner
Jahn Regensburg	Regionalliga Süd	III	Final
FC Augsburg	Oberliga Bayern	IV	Semi-final
Alemannia Haibach	Landesliga Bayern-Nord	V	Semi-final
SpVgg Greuther Fürth II	Oberliga Bayern	IV	First round
SpVgg Landshut	Landesliga Bayern-Mitte	V	First round
SC Luhe-Wildenau	Landesliga Bayern-Mitte	V	First round
1. FC Bamberg	Landesliga Bayern-Nord	V	First round

== Bavarian Cup season 2001-02 ==
Teams qualified for the next round in bold.

=== Regional finals ===
Region	Date	Winner	Finalist	Result
Oberbayern Cup	1 May 2002	FC Bayern Munich II	BCF Wolfratshausen	5–0
Niederbayern Cup	1 May 2002	SpVgg Landshut	SV Hutthurm	2–1
Schwaben Cup	8 May 2002	FC Augsburg	TSV Neusäß	6–0
Oberpfalz Cup	14 May 2002	Jahn Regensburg	**SC Luhe-Wildenau**	2–0
Mittelfranken Cup	15 May 2002	SpVgg Greuther Fürth II	SC 04 Schwabach	1-1 / 4-2 after pen.
Oberfranken Cup	14 May 2002	1. FC Bamberg	SpVgg Bayreuth	1–0
Unterfranken Cup	7 May 2002	Alemannia Haibach	TSV Aubstadt	1-1 / 4-3 after pen.

- The SC Luhe-Wildenau, runners-up of the Oberpfalz Cup is the eights team qualified for the Bavarian Cup due to the Jahn Regensburg from Oberpfalz having won the Cup in the previous season.

=== First round ===
Date	Home	Away	Result
22 May 2002	1. FC Bamberg	**Jahn Regensburg**	3–7
14 May 2002	SpVgg Landshut	**FC Bayern Munich II**	1–6
22 May 2002	**FC Augsburg**	SpVgg Greuther Fürth II	3–0
20 May 2002	SC Luhe-Wildenau	**Alemannia Haibach**	1–4

=== Semi-finals ===
Date	Home	Away	Result
28 May 2002	Alemannia Haibach	**Jahn Regensburg**	1–3
28 May 2002	FC Augsburg	**FC Bayern Munich II**	0–3

=== Final ===
Date	Home	Away	Result	Attendance
20 July 2002	Jahn Regensburg	**FC Bayern Munich II**	1–4	2,000

== DFB Cup 2002-03 ==
The two clubs, FC Bayern Munich II and Jahn Regensburg, who qualified through the Bavarian Cup for the DFB Cup 2002-03 both were knocked out in the first round of the national cup competition:

Round	Date	Home	Away	Result	Attendance
First round	31 August 2002	Jahn Regensburg	LR Ahlen	0–3	5,000
First round	31 August 2002	FC Bayern Munich II	FC Schalke 04	1–2	5,100
