= Bavarian Cup =

Qualifying competition to the German Cup

- Founded: 1998; 28 years ago
- Region: Bavaria
- Teams: 64
- Current champions: Würzburger Kickers (2025–26)
- Most championships: Jahn Regensburg (7 titles)

The Bavarian Cup (German: Bayerischer Toto-Pokal), was created in 1998 and functions as a qualifying competition to the German Cup. It is one of the 21 regional cups in Germany. It is one of three regional associations who are permitted to send two amateur teams to the DFB Cup, the three associations doing so being the largest.

An earlier incarnation of the Bavarian Cup existed from 1947 to 1954.

== History ==
The seven Bezirke in Bavaria each played their own cup competition which in turn used to function as a qualifying to the German Cup (DFB-Pokal). Since 1998 these seven cup-winners plus the losing finalist of the region that won the previous event advanced to the newly introduced Bavarian Cup, the Toto-Pokal. The two finalists of this competition then advanced to the German Cup. Bavarian clubs which play in the first or second Bundesliga were not permitted to take part in the event, their reserve teams however could. Since 2008, reserve teams can not qualify for the DFB Cup any more, a right the clubs traded of for the privilege for reserve teams to play in the 3rd Liga.

Until 1998, the Bavarian Cup only existed in as much as it was a qualifying competition to the German Cup. This meant, in the later years two semi-finals were played to determine the two Bavarian amateur teams entering the DFB-Pokal, but, oddly, no final between these two teams was ever played.

Until 2008, no club had won the Bayernliga and the Bavarian Cup in the same season, until SpVgg Weiden did so in 2008–09.

=== 2009 reform ===
The Bavarian Cup was completely overhauled and enlarged from 2009 onwards. Instead of only eight teams, it now consists of 64 clubs, and will exclude reserve teams. The first round will be held in September of each season and the teams will be made up from the following groups:

- All Bavarian teams in the 3rd Liga and Regionalliga.
- The 24 regional cup winners (Kreispokal), which will be held in August and September.
- The clubs in the Bayernliga and the three Landesligas play a qualification round to determine the teams to fill the remaining spots.

The reason behind the reform is to have all cup games in Bavaria on uniform dates and to allow the clubs in the Landesligas and above to enter the competition later, while clubs below that level will receive a better chance to win their local Kreispokal competition, and with this the associated prize money.

The competition, made up of the 64 teams, is played in a knock-out format. Two teams will continue to qualify for the German Cup, these being the cup winner and the winner of the game between the second and the third placed team. The later changed after 2012 when the second spot was awarded to the best-placed non-reserve side of the Regionalliga Bayern.

== Regional cups ==
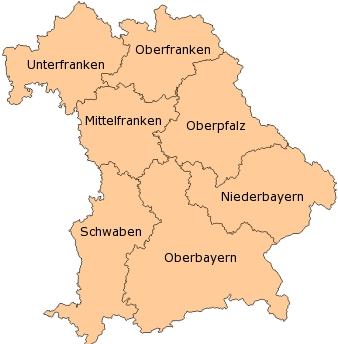
Map of Bavaria: The seven Bezirke

The Bavarian Cup, until 2009, was sub-divided into seven local cup competitions, running roughly along the boundaries of the seven Bezirke. The division was as follows:

- Oberbayern Cup: covering the region of Upper Bavaria
- Niederbayern Cup: covering the region of Lower Bavaria
- Schwaben Cup: covering the region of the Bavarian part of Swabia
- Oberpfalz Cup: covering the region of Upper Palatinate
- Mittelfranken Cup: covering the region of Middle Franconia
- Oberfranken Cup: covering the region of Upper Franconia
- Unterfranken Cup: covering the region of Lower Franconia

== 1947 to 1954 competition ==
From 1947 to 1954, a Bavarian Cup competition was held, which was disbanded shortly after the establishment of the DFB Cup. The first two editions were still organised by the Bavarian state sports association, the Bayerischer Landes-Sportverband, thereafter the competition was held by the Bavarian football association Bayerischer Fußball-Verband, which was founded in June 1946. It was only open to amateur sides, meaning clubs below the 2nd Oberliga Süd, except in 1951, when it was open to all Bavarian clubs. The finals were played by the following clubs:

Date	Location	Winner	Finalist	Result	Attendance
1947	Landshut	Jahn Regensburg	MTV Ingolstadt	2–1	5,000
1948	Nuremberg	Jahn Regensburg	1. FC Bamberg	2–1 aet	
1949	Regensburg	FC Stein	VfL Ingolstadt-Ringsee	3–2	
1950	Amberg	FC Lichtenfels	MTV Ingolstadt	1–0	
1951		BC Augsburg	ASV Cham	4–3	
1952		TSV Gersthofen	SK Lauf	3–0	
1953		SV Saal	FC Gerolzhofen	7–1	
1954		FC Herzogenaurach	TSV Gersthofen	4–2	

== Regional winners ==
The regional cup winners since 1975 were:

=== Pre-Bavarian Cup ===
Franconian regions and Upper Palatinate:

Season	Oberpfalz	Mittelfranken	Oberfranken	Unterfranken
1975		FC Herzogenaurach		
1976				
1977				
1978				
1979				
1980		TSV Röttenbach		
1980		TSV Röttenbach		
1982				
1983				
1984				
1985	ASV Burglengenfeld			
1986		TSV Vestenbergsgreuth		
1987		TSV Vestenbergsgreuth		
1988		BSC Erlangen		
1989		TSV Vestenbergsgreuth		
1990		SpVgg Fürth		
1991		SpVgg Fürth		
1992				
1993				
1994		TSV Vestenbergsgreuth		
1995		1. FC Nuremberg II		
1996	SpVgg Weiden	SpVgg Fürth	FC Bayern Hof	1. FC Schweinfurt 05
1997	SpVgg Weiden	SpVgg Greuther Fürth	TSV Trebgast	DJK Waldberg

Old Bavaria and Swabia:

Season	Oberbayern	Niederbayern	Schwaben
1975			TSG Thannhausen
1976			FC Memmingen
1977			FC Augsburg II
1978			SSV Glött
1979			BSK Neugablonz
1980			FC Augsburg
1981		SpVgg Landshut	TSV 1861 Nördlingen
1982		FC Vilshofen	SV Ober-Germaringen
1983		FC Vilshofen	DJK Langenmosen
1984		FC Vilshofen	TSV Aindling
1985			FC Kempten
1986		SpVgg Landshut	FC Augsburg
1987		SpVgg Landshut	FC Kempten
1988		SpVgg Landshut	FC Augsburg
1989			TSV 1861 Nördlingen
1990			TSV Mindelheim
1991		SpVgg Landshut	FC Gundelfingen
1992			FC Gundelfingen
1993			FC Augsburg
1994			SC Altenmünster
1995	FC Bayern Munich II	SpVgg Landshut	TSV Aindling
1996	1. FC Garmisch	SV Landau/Isar	FC Augsburg
1997	TSV 1860 München II	SV Hutthurm	TSV Aindling

=== Bavarian Cup era ===
Season	Oberpfalz	Mittelfranken	Oberfranken	Unterfranken
1998	SG P/S Regensburg	Jahn Forchheim		
1999		SG Quelle Fürth		
2000	SC Luhe-Wildenau	FSV Erlangen-Bruck	FC Bayern Hof	TSV Großbardorf
2001	Jahn Regensburg	1. FC Nuremberg II	SpVgg Bayreuth	Würzburger FV
2002	Jahn Regensburg	SpVgg Greuther Fürth II	1. FC Bamberg	Alemannia Haibach
2003	Jahn Regensburg	ASV Zirndorf	VfL Frohnlach	TSV Gerbrunn
2004	Jahn Regensburg II	SC 04 Schwabach	FC Bayern Hof	1. FC Sand
2005	SV Etzenricht	SC 04 Schwabach	VfL Frohnlach	TSV Lengfeld
2006	Jahn Regensburg	1. FC Nuremberg II	SpVgg Bayreuth	1. FC Schweinfurt 05
2007	TSV Kareth-Lappersdorf	SV Seligenporten	SpVgg Selbitz	Würzburger FV
2008	1. FC Schwandorf	ASV Neumarkt	SpVgg Selbitz	Alemannia Haibach
2009	SpVgg Weiden	SC Eltersdorf	VfL Frohnlach	1. FC Schweinfurt 05

Season	Oberbayern	Niederbayern	Schwaben
1998	TSV 1860 München II	SV Schalding-Heining	BC Aichach
1999	TSV 1860 Rosenheim	SpVgg Landshut	FC Augsburg
2000	FC Ismaning	SV Riedelhütte	TSV Rain am Lech
2001	FC Bayern Munich II	SpVgg Landshut	FC Gundelfingen
2002	FC Bayern Munich II	SpVgg Landshut	FC Augsburg
2003	TSV 1860 München II	SV Schalding-Heining	TSV Aindling
2004	SpVgg Unterhaching II	SpVgg Landshut	FC Augsburg
2005	FC Ingolstadt 04	1. FC Bad Kötzting	FC Augsburg
2006	FC Ingolstadt 04	SpVgg Landshut	TSG Thannhausen
2007	FC Ingolstadt 04	SV Schalding-Heining	TSV 1861 Nördlingen
2008	SpVgg Unterhaching	SpVgg Landshut	1. FC Sonthofen
2009	SpVgg Unterhaching	SV Schalding-Heining	TSV Aindling

=== Notes ===
Denotes teams qualified for the first round of the DFB-Cup.

- The following teams qualified as regional-cup runners ups for the DFB Cup: Wacker Burghausen in 2009, SpVgg Ansbach in 2008, Jahn Regensburg in 2005 and TSV Aindling in 2004.

== Finals of the Bavarian Cup ==
The finals of the Bavarian Cup:

Date	Location	Winner	Finalist	Result	Attendance
1998	Schalding-Heining	SV Schalding-Heining	Post/Süd Regensburg	1–1 / 6–4 after pen.	
1999	Rosenheim	TSV 1860 Rosenheim	SpVgg Landshut	2–1	
21 July 2000	Rain am Lech	FC Ismaning	TSV Rain am Lech	4–2	800
20 July 2001	Würzburg	Jahn Regensburg	Würzburger FV	3–0	760
20 July 2002	Beratzhausen	Bayern Munich II	Jahn Regensburg	4–1	2,000
18 July 2003	Aindling	TSV Aindling	TSV Gerbrunn	14–0	550
27 July 2004	Aindling	SSV Jahn Regensburg II	TSV Aindling	1–1 / 6–5 after pen.	600
22 July 2005	Ingolstadt	Jahn Regensburg	FC Ingolstadt 04	2–0	900
19 July 2006	Thannhausen	TSG Thannhausen	SpVgg Bayreuth	2–1	600
20 July 2007	Seligenporten	SV Seligenporten	Würzburger FV	1–0	600
18 July 2008	Ansbach	SpVgg Unterhaching	SpVgg Ansbach	1–1 / 6–5 after pen.	800
15 September 2009	Weiden	SpVgg Weiden	Wacker Burghausen	1–0	
10 July 2010	Burghausen	Jahn Regensburg	Wacker Burghausen	4–2	1,036
18 May 2011	Burghausen	Jahn Regensburg	Wacker Burghausen	2–1	1,500
9 May 2012	Burghausen	SpVgg Unterhaching	SC Eltersdorf	4–3	2,000
9 May 2013	Rosenheim	TSV 1860 Rosenheim	Wacker Burghausen	2–2 / 6–5 after pen.	1,800
14 May 2014	Passau	Würzburger Kickers	SV Schalding-Heining	2–2 / 4–2 after pen.	2,070
20 May 2015	Weiden	SpVgg Unterhaching	SpVgg SV Weiden	2–2 / 6–5 after pen.	2,200
28 May 2016	Unterhaching	Würzburger Kickers	SpVgg Unterhaching	6–2	3,200
25 May 2017	Burghausen	1. FC Schweinfurt 05	SV Wacker Burghausen	1–0	2,485
21 May 2018	Bayreuth	1. FC Schweinfurt 05	SpVgg Bayreuth	3–1	3,762
25 May 2019	Aschaffenburg	Würzburger Kickers	Viktoria Aschaffenburg	3–0	6,033
5 September 2020	Munich	TSV 1860 Munich	Würzburger Kickers	1–1 / 4–1 after pen.	0
27 June 2021	Illertissen	Türkgücü München	FV Illertissen	0–0 / 8–7 after pen.	0
21 May 2022	Illertissen	FV Illertissen	TSV Aubstadt	1–1 / 4–3 after pen.	1,620
3 June 2023	Illertissen	FV Illertissen	FC Ingolstadt	2–2 / 5–3 after pen.	
25 May 2024	Würzburg	FC Ingolstadt	Würzburger Kickers	2–1	4,131
24 May 2025	Illertissen	FV Illertissen	SpVgg Unterhaching	1–0	2,167
23 May 2026	Würzburg	Würzburger Kickers	1860 Munich	1–1 / 4–2 after pen.	11,017

- The reason for the heavy defeat of TSV Gerbrunn in 2003 is the fact that the Bavarian Cup final is always played at the beginning of the next season, in July, and the club had since withdrawn its team from the Bayernliga to a lower league, therefore fielding a considerable weaker team.

== DFB Cup performance ==
Up until 2011, no team qualified from the Bavarian Cup to the national cup competition had won a game in this competition, with the FC Ingolstadt 04 (2005), Wacker Burghausen (2009) and Jahn Regensburg (2010) the only clubs to achieve a draw after extra time, all three going out on penalties. In the first round of the 2011–12 competition, SpVgg Unterhaching finally ended this drought for the Bavarian clubs, defeating SC Freiburg 3–2 courtesy of a converted 87th-minute penalty. The most common team to be drawn against for Bavarian clubs is Borussia Dortmund, having been the opposition on four occasions:

- 1998–99 DFB-Pokal

Round	Date	Home	Away	Result	Attendance
First round	28 August 1998	SV Schalding-Heining	SpVgg Unterhaching	0–1	2,200
First round	30 August 1998	SG Post/Süd Regensburg	Hertha BSC Berlin	0–2	5,000

- 1999–2000 DFB-Pokal

Round	Date	Home	Away	Result	Attendance
Second round	8 August 1999	TSV 1860 Rosenheim	FC St. Pauli	1–2	4,000
Second round	7 August 1999	SpVgg Landshut	Hansa Rostock	0–2	4,500

- 2000–01 DFB-Pokal

Round	Date	Home	Away	Result	Attendance
First round	27 August 2000	TSV Rain am Lech	FC Schalke 04	0–7	6,000
First round	26 August 2000	FC Ismaning	Borussia Dortmund	0–4	7,000

- 2001–02 DFB-Pokal

Round	Date	Home	Away	Result	Attendance
First round	26 August 2001	Jahn Regensburg	Bayer Leverkusen	0–3	10,500
First round	25 August 2001	Würzburger FV	TSV 1860 München	0–10	10,100

- 2002–03 DFB-Pokal

Round	Date	Home	Away	Result	Attendance
First round	31 August 2002	Jahn Regensburg	LR Ahlen	0–3	5,000
First round	31 August 2002	FC Bayern Munich II	FC Schalke 04	1–2	5,100

- 2003–04 DFB-Pokal

Round	Date	Home	Away	Result	Attendance
First round	30 August 2003	TSV Aindling	FC Schalke 04	0–3	6,400
First round	30 August 2003	TSV Gerbrunn	Wacker Burghausen	0–14	815

- 2004–05 DFB-Pokal

Round	Date	Home	Away	Result	Attendance
First round	22 August 2004	TSV Aindling	Hertha BSC Berlin	0–1	5,200
First round	20 August 2004	Jahn Regensburg II	SpVgg Unterhaching	1–3	500

- 2005–06 DFB-Pokal

Round	Date	Home	Away	Result	Attendance
First round	20 August 2005	FC Ingolstadt 04	1. FC Saarbrücken	1–1 aet / 4–5 pen	2,000
First round	20 August 2005	Jahn Regensburg	Alemannia Aachen	1–3 aet	4,500

- 2006–07 DFB-Pokal

Round	Date	Home	Away	Result	Attendance
First round	9 September 2006	TSG Thannhausen	Borussia Dortmund	0–3	10,500
First round	9 September 2006	SpVgg Bayreuth	Kickers Offenbach	0–2	2,850

- 2007–08 DFB-Pokal

Round	Date	Home	Away	Result	Attendance
First round	5 August 2007	SV Seligenporten	Arminia Bielefeld	0–2	3,500
First round	5 August 2007	Würzburger FV	VfL Wolfsburg	0–4	11,200

- 2008–09 DFB-Pokal

Round	Date	Home	Away	Result	Attendance
First round	8 August 2008	SpVgg Unterhaching	SC Freiburg	0–2	2,800
First round	10 August 2008	SpVgg Ansbach	Karlsruher SC	0–5	4,000

- 2009–10 DFB-Pokal

Round	Date	Home	Away	Result	Attendance
First round	1 August 2009	SpVgg Weiden	Borussia Dortmund	1–3	9,765
First round	1 August 2009	Wacker Burghausen	Rot Weiss Ahlen	1–1 aet / 4–5 pen	2,900

- 2010–11 DFB-Pokal

Round	Date	Home	Away	Result	Attendance
First round	13 August 2010	Jahn Regensburg	Arminia Bielefeld	1–1 aet / 5–6 pen	5,212
First round	14 August 2010	Wacker Burghausen	Borussia Dortmund	0–3	10,500

- 2011–12 DFB-Pokal

Round	Date	Home	Away	Result	Attendance
First round	29 July 2011	Jahn Regensburg	Borussia Mönchengladbach	1–3	10,388
First round	31 July 2011	SpVgg Unterhaching	SC Freiburg	3–2	4,100
Second round	25 October 2011	SpVgg Unterhaching	VfL Bochum	1–4	3,150

- 2012–13 DFB-Pokal

Round	Date	Home	Away	Result	Attendance
First round	19 August 2012	Wacker Burghausen	Fortuna Düsseldorf	0–1	3,100
First round	18 August 2012	SpVgg Unterhaching	1. FC Köln	1–2	7,500

- 2013–14 DFB-Pokal

Round	Date	Home	Away	Result	Attendance
First round	2 August 2013	TSV 1860 Rosenheim	VfR Aalen	0–2	2,000

- 2014–15 DFB-Pokal

Round	Date	Home	Away	Result	Attendance
First round	17 August 2014	Würzburger Kickers	Fortuna Düsseldorf	3–2 aet	10,500
Second round	28 October 2014	Würzburger Kickers	Eintracht Braunschweig	0–1	11,240

- 2015–16 DFB-Pokal

Round	Date	Home	Away	Result	Attendance
First round	9 August 2015	SpVgg Unterhaching	FC Ingolstadt 04	2–1	6,500
Second round	27 October 2015	SpVgg Unterhaching	RB Leipzig	3–0	5,000
Third round	15 December 2015	SpVgg Unterhaching	Bayer Leverkusen	1–3	12,500

- 2016–17 DFB-Pokal

Round	Date	Home	Away	Result	Attendance
First round	20 August 2016	SpVgg Unterhaching	FSV Mainz 05	3–3 aet / 2–4 pen	7,000

- 2017–18 DFB-Pokal

Round	Date	Home	Away	Result	Attendance
First round	13 August 2017	1. FC Schweinfurt 05	SV Sandhausen	2–1	4,610
Second round	24 October 2017	1. FC Schweinfurt 05	Eintracht Frankfurt	0–4	15,060

- 2018–19 DFB-Pokal

Round	Date	Home	Away	Result	Attendance
First round	17 August 2018	1. FC Schweinfurt 05	FC Schalke 04	0–2	15,060
