= 2000 Bavarian Cup =

German regional football competition

- Founded
- 1998
- Nation
- Germany
- State
- Bavaria
- Qualifying competition for
- German Cup
- Champions 2000
- FC Ismaning

The 2000 Bavarian Cup was the third edition of the competition which started in 1998. It ended with the FC Ismaning winning the competition. Together with finalist TSV Rain am Lech, both clubs qualified for the DFB Cup 2000-01.

The competition is open to all senior men's football teams playing within the Bavarian football league system and the Bavarian clubs in the Regionalliga Süd (III).

== Rules & History ==
The seven Bezirke in Bavaria each play their own cup competition, which in turn used to function as a qualifying to the German Cup (DFB-Pokal). Since 1998, these seven cup-winners plus the losing finalist of the region that won the previous event advance to the newly introduced Bavarian Cup, the Toto-Pokal. The two finalists of this competition advance to the German Cup. Bavarian clubs which play in the first or second Bundesliga are not permitted to take part in the event; their reserve teams however can. The seven regional cup winners were qualified for the first round. It was the last edition with only seven clubs. The following season, the competition was expanded to eight teams.

== Participating clubs ==
The following seven clubs qualified for the 2000 Bavarian Cup:

| Club | League | Tier | Cup performance |
|---|---|---|---|
| FC Ismaning | Landesliga Bayern-Süd | V | Winner |
| TSV Rain am Lech | Landesliga Bayern-Süd | V | Final |
| TSV Großbardorf | Landesliga Bayern-Nord | V | Semi-final |
| SV Riedelhütte | Landesliga Bayern-Mitte | V | Semi-final |
| FC Bayern Hof | Oberliga Bayern | IV | First round |
| FSV Erlangen-Bruck | Bezirksoberliga Mittelfranken | VI | First round |
| SC Luhe-Wildenau | Landesliga Bayern-Mitte | V | First round |

== Bavarian Cup season 1999-2000 ==
Teams qualified for the next round in bold.

=== Regional finals ===
| Region | Date | Winner | Finalist | Result |
|---|---|---|---|---|
| Oberbayern Cup | 10 May 2000 | FC Ismaning | Wacker Burghausen | 2-0 |
| Niederbayern Cup | 17 May 2000 | SV Riedelhütte | SV Schalding-Heining | 3-1 after pen. |
| Schwaben Cup | 17 May 2000 | TSV Rain am Lech | TSV Mindelheim | 2-0 |
| Oberpfalz Cup | 17 May 2000 | SC Luhe-Wildenau | SG Post/Süd Regensburg | 6-5 after pen. |
| Mittelfranken Cup | 9 May 2000 | FSV Erlangen-Bruck | SC 04 Schwabach | 2-1 |
| Oberfranken Cup | 17 May 2000 | FC Bayern Hof | SpVgg Stegaurach | 3-2 after pen. |
| Unterfranken Cup | 23 May 2000 | TSV Großbardorf | TSV Sulzfeld | 2-0 |

=== First round ===
| Date | Home | Away | Result |
|---|---|---|---|
| 31 May 2000 | **SV Riedelhütte** | SC Luhe-Wildenau | 5-0 |
| 31 May 2000 | FSV Erlangen-Bruck | **TSV Großbardorf** | 2-2 / 1-3 after pen. |
| 31 May 2000 | **TSV Rain am Lech** | FC Bayern Hof | 3-2 |
| | **FC Ismaning** | | bye |

=== Semi-finals ===
| Date | Home | Away | Result |
|---|---|---|---|
| 3 June 2000 | TSV Großbardorf | **FC Ismaning** | 0-4 |
| 3 June 2000 | SV Riedelhütte | **TSV Rain am Lech** | 0-0 / 2-4 after pen. |

=== Final ===
| Date | Home | Away | Result | Attendance |
|---|---|---|---|---|
| 21 July 2000 | TSV Rain am Lech | **FC Ismaning** | 2-4 | 800 |

== DFB Cup 2000-01 ==
The two clubs, TSV Rain am Lech and FC Ismaning, who qualified through the Bavarian Cup for the DFB Cup 2000-01, both were knocked out in the first round of the national cup competition:

| Round | Date | Home | Away | Result | Attendance |
|---|---|---|---|---|---|
| First round | 27 August 2000 | TSV Rain am Lech | FC Schalke 04 | 0-7 | 6,000 |
| First round | 26 August 2000 | FC Ismaning | Borussia Dortmund | 0-4 | 7,000 |
