= 2004 Bavarian Cup =

German regional football competition

- Founded
- 1998
- Nation
- Germany
- State
- Bavaria
- Qualifying competition for
- German Cup
- Champions 2004
- Jahn Regensburg II

The 2004 Bavarian Cup was the seventh edition of this competition which was started in 1998. It ended with the Jahn Regensburg II winning the competition. Together with the finalist, TSV Aindling, both clubs were qualified for the DFB Cup 2004-05.

The competition is open to all senior men's football teams playing within the Bavarian football league system and the Bavarian clubs in the Regionalliga Süd (III).

== Rules & History ==
The seven Bezirke in Bavaria each play their own cup competition which in turn used to function as a qualifying to the German Cup (DFB-Pokal). Since 1998 these seven cup-winners plus the losing finalist of the region that won the previous event advance to the newly introduced Bavarian Cup, the Toto-Pokal. The two finalists of this competition advance to the German Cup. Bavarian clubs which play in the first or second Bundesliga are not permitted to take part in the event, their reserve teams however can. The seven regional cup winners plus the finalist from last season's winners region are qualified for the first round.

== Participating clubs ==
The following eight clubs qualified for the 2004 Bavarian Cup:

Club	League	Tier	Cup performance
Jahn Regensburg II	Oberliga Bayern	IV	Winner
TSV Aindling	Oberliga Bayern	IV	Final
FC Augsburg	Regionalliga Süd	III	Semi-final
SC 04 Schwabach	Oberliga Bayern	IV	Semi-final
SpVgg Landshut	Oberliga Bayern	IV	First round
SpVgg Unterhaching II	Oberliga Bayern	IV	First round
FC Bayern Hof	Oberliga Bayern	IV	First round
1. FC Sand	Landesliga Bayern-Nord	V	First round

== Bavarian Cup season 2003-04 ==
Teams qualified for the next round in bold.

=== Regional finals ===
Region	Date	Winner	Finalist	Result
Oberbayern Cup	5 May 2004	SpVgg Unterhaching II	1. FC Garmisch-Partenkirchen	5-0
Niederbayern Cup	5 May 2004	SpVgg Landshut	SpVgg Hankofen-Hailing	3-1
Schwaben Cup	12 May 2004	FC Augsburg	**TSV Aindling**	3-3 / 7-6 after pen.
Oberpfalz Cup	11 May 2004	Jahn Regensburg II	ASV Cham	2-1
Mittelfranken Cup	11 May 2004	SC 04 Schwabach	1. FC Nuremberg II	1-0
Oberfranken Cup	11 May 2004	FC Bayern Hof	VfL Frohnlach	3-1
Unterfranken Cup	11 May 2004	1. FC Sand	1. FC Schweinfurt 05	0-0 / 6-5 after pen.

=== First round ===
Date	Home	Away	Result
19 May 2004	SpVgg Landshut	**Jahn Regensburg II**	1-3
19 May 2004	1. FC Sand	**SC 04 Schwabach**	0-0 / 1-3 after pen.
19 May 2004	**TSV Aindling**	SpVgg Unterhaching II	0-0 / 4-2 after pen.
19 May 2004	FC Bayern Hof	**FC Augsburg**	0-3

=== Semi-finals ===
Date	Home	Away	Result
26 May 2004	**Jahn Regensburg II**	FC Augsburg	2-1
26 May 2004	**TSV Aindling**	SC 04 Schwabach	2-0

=== Final ===
Date	Home	Away	Result	Attendance
27 July 2004	TSV Aindling	**Jahn Regensburg II**	1-1 / 5-6 after pen.	600

== DFB Cup 2004-05 ==
The two clubs, TSV Aindling and Jahn Regensburg II, who qualified through the Bavarian Cup for the DFB Cup 2004-05 both were knocked out in the first round of the national cup competition:

Round	Date	Home	Away	Result	Attendance
First round	22 August 2004	TSV Aindling	Hertha BSC Berlin	0-1	5,200
First round	20 August 2004	Jahn Regensburg II	SpVgg Unterhaching	1-3	500
