= 1999 Bavarian Cup =

German regional football competition

- Founded
- 1998
- Nation
- Germany
- State
- Bavaria
- Qualifying competition for
- German Cup
- Champions 1999
- TSV 1860 Rosenheim

The 1999 Bavarian Cup was the second edition of this competition which was started in 1998. It ended with the TSV 1860 Rosenheim winning the competition. Together with the finalist, SpVgg Landshut, both clubs were qualified for the DFB Cup 1999-00.

The competition is open to all senior men's football teams playing within the Bavarian football league system and the Bavarian clubs in the Regionalliga Süd (III).

== Rules & History ==
The seven Bezirke in Bavaria each play their own cup competition which in turn used to function as a qualifying to the German Cup (DFB-Pokal). Since 1998 these seven cup-winners plus the losing finalist of the region that won the previous event advance to the newly introduced Bavarian Cup, the Toto-Pokal. The two finalists of this competition advance to the German Cup. Bavarian clubs which play in the first or second Bundesliga are not permitted to take part in the event, their reserve teams however can. The seven regional cup winners were qualified for the first round.

== Participating clubs ==
The following seven clubs qualified for the 1999 Bavarian Cup:

Club	League	Tier	Cup performance
TSV 1860 Rosenheim	Landesliga Bayern-Süd	V	Winner
SpVgg Landshut	Oberliga Bayern	IV	Final
			Semi-final
			Semi-final
			First round
			First round
			First round

== Bavarian Cup season 1998-99 ==
Teams qualified for the next round in bold.

=== Regional finals ===
Region	Date	Winner	Finalist	Result
Oberbayern Cup		**TSV 1860 Rosenheim**		
Niederbayern Cup		**SpVgg Landshut**		
Schwaben Cup		**FC Augsburg**	TSV Kottern	4-2
Oberpfalz Cup				
Mittelfranken Cup		**SG Quelle Fürth**	1. SC Feucht	4-2
Oberfranken Cup				
Unterfranken Cup				

=== First round ===
Date	Home	Away	Result
1999			
1999			
1999			
			bye

=== Semi-finals ===
Date	Home	Away	Result
1999			
1999			

=== Final ===
Date	Home	Away	Result	Attendance
1999	**TSV 1860 Rosenheim**	SpVgg Landshut	2-1	

== DFB Cup 1999-2000 ==
The two clubs, TSV 1860 Rosenheim and SpVgg Landshut, who qualified through the Bavarian Cup for the DFB Cup 1999-00 both were knocked out in the second round of the national cup competition, having received a bye in the first round:

Round	Date	Home	Away	Result	Attendance
Second round	8 August 1999	TSV 1860 Rosenheim	FC St. Pauli	1-2	
Second round	7 August 1999	SpVgg Landshut	Hansa Rostock	0-2	
