= SSV Jahn Regensburg II =

German football club

- Full name: Sport- und Schwimmverein; Jahn Regensburg e. V.
- Ground: Sportpark am Kaulbachweg
- Capacity: 4,500
- Manager: Ilija Dzepina
- League: Bayernliga Nord (V)
- 2025–26: Bayernliga Nord, 9th of 18
Home colours	Away colours	Third colours

The SSV Jahn Regensburg II is the reserve team of German association football club SSV Jahn Regensburg from the city of Regensburg, Bavaria.

The team currently plays in the northern division of the Bayernliga, the fifth tier of the German football league system. It first played in the Bayernliga in 1962–63, with the league then being the third tier of the league system.

== History ==
The reserve team of Jahn Regensburg first rose to prominence when it played at the highest Bavarian level, then the tier three Bayernliga, for a season in 1962–63, courtesy to a title in the 2nd Amateurliga Niederbayern in 1962. The side then played under the name of SSV Jahn Regensburg Amateure and came thirteenth in the southern division of the league and was immediately relegated as the league was reduced from two to one division that season. With the decline of the senior team which was relegated from the tier two 2nd Oberliga Süd to the Bayernliga in 1963 the reserve side quickly disappeared into regional football again.

The team returned to Bayernliga level in 2002 when it took up the spot of SG Post/Süd Regensburg in the league, the later having joined Jahn that year, now playing as Jahn Regensburg II as the senior team was not a professional side anymore. The team finished in mid-table for the next four seasons in this league but was forced to step down to the Landesliga Bayern-Mitte in 2006 after the senior team itself had been relegated to the Bayernliga once more.

While the first team returned to the Regionalliga Süd immediately the following year Jahn II spend the next six seasons in the Landesliga. The last three of those the team came close to promotion on each occasion but it took until 2012 for the side to move up to the Bayernliga again. With the later league expanded once more to two divisions the team was grouped in the southern one for the first season. In 2013 the side was then transferred to the northern division where it played for three seasons until 2016 when it moved back to the south.

== Honours ==
The club's honours:

=== League ===
- Landesliga Bayern-Mitte (IV)
  - Runners-up: 2011
- 2nd Amateurliga Niederbayern (IV)
  - Champions: 1962

=== Cup ===
- Bavarian Cup
  - Winners: 2004
- Oberpfalz Cup
  - Winners: 2004

== Recent seasons ==
The recent season-by-season performance of the club:

Season	Division	Tier	Position
2002–03	Bayernliga	IV	11th
2003–04	Bayernliga	IV	8th
2004–05	Bayernliga	IV	8th
2005–06	Bayernliga	IV	11th ↓
2006–07	Landesliga Bayern-Mitte	V	14th
2007–08	Landesliga Bayern-Mitte	V	8th
2008–09	Landesliga Bayern-Mitte	VI	11th
2009–10	Landesliga Bayern-Mitte	VI	3rd
2010–11	Landesliga Bayern-Mitte	VI	2nd
2011–12	Landesliga Bayern-Mitte	VI	3rd ↑
2012–13	Bayernliga Süd	V	5th
2013–14	Bayernliga Nord	V	7th
2014–15	Bayernliga Nord	V	6th
2015–16	Bayernliga Nord	V	13th
2016–17	Bayernliga Süd	V	16th ↓
2017–18	Landesliga Bayern-Mitte	VI	1st ↑
2018–19	Bayernliga Süd	V	3rd
2019–21	Bayernliga Süd	V	12th
2021–22	Bayernliga Süd	V	4th

- With the introduction of the Bezirksoberligas in 1988 as the new fifth tier, below the Landesligas, all leagues below dropped one tier. With the introduction of the Regionalligas in 1994 and the 3. Liga in 2008 as the new third tier, below the 2. Bundesliga, all leagues below dropped one tier. With the establishment of the Regionalliga Bayern as the new fourth tier in Bavaria in 2012 the Bayernliga was split into a northern and a southern division, the number of Landesligas expanded from three to five and the Bezirksoberligas abolished. All leagues from the Bezirksligas onwards were elevated one tier.

=== Key ===
↑ Promoted	↓ Relegated
