= Bernd Rosinger =

German footballer

Personal information
- Full name: Bernd Rosinger
- Date of birth: 30 August 1989 (age 37)
- Place of birth: Neumarkt in der Oberpfalz, Germany
- Height: 1.82 m (6 ft 0 in)
- Position: Forward

Team information
- Current team: SV Seligenporten
- Number: 8

Youth career
- 1992–2008: BSC Woffenbach

Senior career*
Years	Team	Apps	(Gls)
2008–2009	BSC Woffenbach		
2009–2013	SV Seligenporten	92	(42)
2013–2014	FC Nürnberg II	26	(8)
2014	Wacker Burghausen	8	(0)
2014–2018	Sportfreunde Lotte	98	(22)
2018–2019	FC Homburg	14	(0)
2019–	SV Seligenporten	17	(7)
- * Club domestic league appearances and goals as of 14:36, 25 November 2019 (UTC)

Bernd Rosinger (born 30 August 1989) is a German footballer who plays as a forward for SV Seligenporten.
