= TSV Aindling =

German football club

- Full name: Turn- und Sportverein Aindling 1946 e. V.
- Founded: 1946
- Ground: Schüsselhauser Kreuz
- Capacity: 4,000
- Chairman: Horst Geier
- Manager: Roland Bahl
- League: Landesliga Bayern-Südwest (VI)
- 2015–16: 8th
Home colours	Away colours

TSV Aindling is a German football club from the city of Aindling, Bavaria. It is part of a larger sports club that also has departments for women's and children's gymnastics, ice stock, skiing, tennis, and volleyball.

== History ==
The club was founded in 1946 as Turn- und Sportverein Aindling-Todtenweis and in 1956 merged with TSV Pichl.

The clubs first rose out of regional Schwaben football in 1982 when they won the Bezirksliga Schwaben-Nord and were promoted to the Landesliga Bayern-Süd (V) where they made an immediate impact with a second-place finish. They took part in a promotion round for the Bayernliga (IV) but failed to advance. Their second season in the league was almost as successful, finishing third, but, after this, the team declined and in 1989, it was relegated to the Bezirksoberliga Schwaben (V).

The club again gained promotion from the Bezirksoberliga to the Landesliga Bayern-Süd (V) in 1992 on the strength of a second-place finish. A second-place result at that level in 1996 then earned the team promotion to the Fußball-Bayernliga (IV) where they established themselves firmly as a mid-table side.

The 2008–09 season became the club's most successful to-date, finishing runners-up in the Bayernliga.

TSV qualified for play in the DFB-Pokal (German Cup) in 2003 and 2004, but went out early on both occasions against Bundesliga sides. In 2003, they won the Bavarian Cup with a 14–0 victory over TSV Gerbrunn and made a losing appearance in the next year's final versus SSV Jahn Regensburg II.

The club made negative headlines in 2011 when it, club officials and current and former players were raided by the German customs department in December 2011. Aindling was thought to have knowingly withheld social security payments. Consequently, the club declined to apply for a licence for the new Regionalliga Bayern but retained its place in the Bayernliga, entering the southern division of the newly divided league from 2012.

The club's 17 season long stay in the Bayernliga came to an end in 2013 when it finished on a relegation play-off rank and lost to DJK Vilzing on away goal rule after drawing nil-all away and one-all at home. The following Landesliga season proved difficult for the club, too, only retaining its league membership through success in the relegation round.

Shortly after the start of the 2014–15 season it was announced that the club had illegally withheld €2.1 million in tax and social security payments between 2003 and 2011 by not declaring income and player wages. Four former and current officials were charged by the state prosecuted in Augsburg. The amount of money involved in the case is unusually high for a club formerly at Bayernliga level, a tier five league.

In August 2015, the club declared insolvency but continued to play in the Landesliga.

The club's reserve team, the TSV Aindling II has been playing in the Bezirksliga Schwaben-Nord from 2003 to 2012 when it was relegated to the Kreisliga.

== Honours ==
The club's honours:

=== League ===
- Bayernliga (V)
  - Runners-up: 2009
- Landesliga Bayern-Süd (IV-V)
  - Runners-up: 1983, 1996
- Bezirksoberliga Schwaben (V)
  - Runners-up: 1992
- Bezirksliga Schwaben-Nord (V)
  - Champions: 1982

=== Cup ===
- Bavarian Cup
  - Winners: 2003
  - Runners-up: 2004
- Schwaben Cup
  - Winners: (5) 1984, 1995, 1997, 2003, 2009
  - Runners-up: (3) 1981, 1985, 2004

== Recent managers ==
Recent managers of the club:

Manager	Start	Finish
Helmut Riedl	1 July 2006	30 June 2008
Manfred Paula	1 July 2008	30 June 2009
Helmut Leihe	1 July 2009	?
Torsten Just	?	30 June 2010
Manfred Paula	1 July 2010	30 June 2011
Stefan Anderl	30 June 2011	3 April 2012
Martin Schreier	3 April 2012	30 June 2012
Klaus Wünsch	1 July 2012	18 September 2012
Harry Kiechl Magnus Hoffmann (charetakers)	18 September 2012	31 December 2012
Roland Bahl	1 January 2013	present

== TSV Aindling seasons ==
The recent season-by-season performance of the club:

=== TSV Aindling ===
Year	Division	Tier	Position
1981–82	Bezirksliga Schwaben-Nord	V	1st ↑
1982–83	Landesliga Bayern-Süd	IV	2nd
1983–84	Landesliga Bayern-Süd	IV	3rd
1984–85	Landesliga Bayern-Süd	IV	13th
1985–86	Landesliga Bayern-Süd	IV	11th
1986–87	Landesliga Bayern-Süd	IV	9th
1987–88	Landesliga Bayern-Süd	IV	12th
1988–89	Landesliga Bayern-Süd	IV	14th ↓
1989–90	Bezirksoberliga Schwaben	V	4th
1990–91	Bezirksoberliga Schwaben	V	5th
1991–92	Bezirksoberliga Schwaben	V	2nd ↑
1992–93	Landesliga Bayern-Süd	IV	7th
1993–94	Landesliga Bayern-Süd	IV	15th
1994–95	Landesliga Bayern-Süd	V	6th
1995–96	Landesliga Bayern-Süd	V	2nd ↑
1996–97	Bayernliga	IV	13th
1997–98	Bayernliga	IV	13th
1998–99	Bayernliga	IV	11th

Year	Division	Tier	Position
1999–2000	Bayernliga	IV	7th
2000–01	Bayernliga	IV	7th
2001–02	Bayernliga	IV	10th
2002–03	Bayernliga	IV	7th
2003–04	Bayernliga	IV	12th
2004–05	Bayernliga	IV	14th
2005–06	Bayernliga	IV	8th
2006–07	Bayernliga	IV	7th
2007–08	Bayernliga	IV	12th
2008–09	Bayernliga	V	2nd
2009–10	Bayernliga	V	4th
2010–11	Bayernliga	V	13th
2011–12	Bayernliga	V	16th
2012–13	Bayernliga Süd	V	15th ↓
2013–14	Landesliga Bayern-Südwest	VI	16th
2014–15	Landesliga Bayern-Südwest	VI	12th
2015–16	Landesliga Bayern-Südwest	VI	8th
2016–17	Landesliga Bayern-Südwest	VI	

=== TSV Aindling II ===
Year	Division	Tier	Position
2002–03	Kreisliga Schwaben-Ost	VIII	1st ↑
2003–04	Bezirksliga Schwaben-Nord	VII	5th
2004–05	Bezirksliga Schwaben-Nord	VII	6th
2005–06	Bezirksliga Schwaben-Nord	VII	9th
2006–07	Bezirksliga Schwaben-Nord	VII	10th
2007–08	Bezirksliga Schwaben-Nord	VII	7th
2008–09	Bezirksliga Schwaben-Nord	VIII	3rd
2009–10	Bezirksliga Schwaben-Nord	VIII	8th
2010–11	Bezirksliga Schwaben-Nord	VIII	6th
2011–12	Bezirksliga Schwaben-Nord	VIII	9th ↓
2012–13	Kreisliga Schwaben-Ost	VIII	13th
2013–14	Kreisliga Schwaben-Ost	VIII	16th ↓
2014–present	Inactive		

- With the introduction of the Bezirksoberligas in 1988 as the new fifth tier, below the Landesligas, all leagues below dropped one tier. With the introduction of the Regionalligas in 1994 and the 3. Liga in 2008 as the new third tier, below the 2. Bundesliga, all leagues below dropped one tier. With the establishment of the Regionalliga Bayern as the new fourth tier in Bavaria in 2012 the Bayernliga was split into a northern and a southern division, the number of Landesligas expanded from three to five and the Bezirksoberligas abolished. All leagues from the Bezirksligas onwards were elevated one tier.

↑ Promoted	↓ Relegated

== DFB-Pokal appearances ==
The club has qualified for the first round of the German Cup two times:

Season	Round	Date	Home	Away	Result	Attendance
2003–04 DFB-Pokal	First round	30 August 2003	TSV Aindling	FC Schalke 04	0–3	6,400
2004–05 DFB-Pokal	First round	22 August 2004	TSV Aindling	Hertha BSC	0–1	5,200

Source:"DFB-Pokal" (in German). Weltfussball.de.
