= TSV Rain am Lech =

German football club

- Full name: TSV 1896 Rain am Lech
- Founded: 1896
- Ground: Georg-Weber-Stadion
- Capacity: 3.400
- Chairman: Matthias Bohn
- Manager: Dominik Bobinger
- League: Landesliga Bayern-Südwest (VI)
- 2024–25: Bayernliga Süd, 17th of 17 (relegated)
Home colours	Away colours	Third colours

The TSV Rain am Lech is a German association football club from the town of Rain am Lech, Bavaria.

The club's most notable achievement has been qualifying for the tier four Regionalliga Bayern in 2012, where it played for two seasons before relegation in 2014. It returned to this league for a single season after a Bayernliga title in 2015. The club has also qualified for the first round of the DFB-Pokal, the German Cup, once, courtesy of a runners-up finish in the Bavarian Cup.

== History ==
The club was formed in 1896 under the name TV Rain am Lech as a gymnastics club. A football department was however not formed, instead, the FC Rain am Lech came into being on 31 August 1920 and took up the sport.

While the two clubs existed independently for many years, in 1941 a forced merger formed the TSG Rain am Lech. The worsening war situation had made this step necessary but activities were severely limited in the coming years.

With the end of the Second World War, this forced merger ended and both clubs became independent again. The FC soon reestablished itself but the TV was struggling to do so due to a high number of losses of its members during the war. In the spring of 1946, the two clubs decided to merge once more, this time by free choice and the TSV Rain am Lech was formed. The new club retained the old colors of the TV, red and white. A new club constitution was drafted on 30 April 1946 and the US occupation authorities sanctioned the new club on 6 May 1946. By the end of June 1946, the new club already had 180 members. While the club offered a number of sports, football was virtually the only one played on a competitive level.

In 1987, the club celebrated a new record in membership, having reached 1,000 members.

=== Football ===
After its formation in 1920, The FC Rain entered the 2nd Kreisklasse Schwaben Nord, a league it performed rather well in the coming seasons. After its third title in this league in 1929–30, it earned promotion to the 1st Kreisklasse, where it spent two seasons before being relegated again. The club once more achieved promotion in 1937 but this time only lasted for one year in the higher level. Despite winning the title and promotion again in 1938–39 the FC Rain chose to withdraw from the league due to the outbreak of the war.

The club continued in 1945 where it finished six years earlier, earning good results in the 2nd Kreisliga. Under the new name of TSV Rain, this trend continued.

In 1949, the 2nd Kreisliga was renamed B-Klasse and the club belonged to this league for two seasons until winning promotion in 1951 to the now A-Klasse Nordschwaben. The TSV remained in this league until 1962 with the exception of 1953–54, when one season was spent in the level below.

In 1962, a A-Klassen championship earned them promotion to the Bezirksliga for the first time and the team held this league, the Bezirksliga Schwaben (V) until 1967. From 1967 to 1974, they played in the A-Klasse once more. Another title in this league in 1973–74 meant a return to the now regionalised Bezirksliga Schwaben-Nord. In this league, the TSV Rain finished on top in its first season and earned promotion for the first time to the Landesliga Bayern-Süd (IV). The Landesliga proved to be a much harder place to succeed in and the team was immediately relegated.

After five Bezirksliga years and a championship in 1981, the club returned once more to the Landesliga, with the same result as before, relegation after one season. After a respectable 5th place in the Bezirksliga in 1983, the following season the team was relegated back to the A-Klasse. TSV returned to the Bezirksliga for 1986–87 but could not maintain this level and experienced a sharp decline, falling down to the B-Klasse in 1988. It recovered quickly with a B-Klasse championship in 1988–89.

The club's rise to greater success came in 1994, when, after five seasons in the A-Klasse, promotion to the Bezirksliga was archived. The club marched straight on to the Bezirksoberliga Schwaben in 1995, a relatively new league established in 1989. In its second season there, it earned promotion back to the Landesliga for a third time.

Now much stronger than in its two previous attempts, the team held the class and established itself in the top-half of this league. In the next eleven seasons, three third places in 2005, 2007, and 2008 were the highlights.

The TSV won the Schwaben Cup for its first time in 2000. This qualified the team for the Bavarian Cup, where it finished runner-up. This in turn meant that the club could play in the DFB Cup 2000–01, where it was paired with the later winner, FC Schalke 04. A 0–7 home defeat for the then fifth division club against a Bundesliga team was a highlight in the history for the small amateur side.

Due to changes in the German league system in 2008, the third place qualified the club to take part in a promotion round for the Oberliga Bayern, something usually reserved for the second-placed team. Rain succeeded in this, earning for the first time promotion to Bavarias highest football league, beating the 1. FC Schweinfurt 05 3–0 after extra time to do so.

Like in its past experiences when earning promotion to a higher league for the first time, the club found it a hard level to play at and success was much harder to come by. The club had to continue its fight for Bayernliga survival in the post-season, having finished on equal points with Würzburger FV (14th) and SV Seligenporten (15th) and therefore required a set of deciders to be played, which it won.

At the end of the 2011–12 season the club managed to finish in the top nine of the Bayernliga and thereby directly qualified for the new tier four Regionalliga Bayern.

After an eleventh place in the inaugural Regionalliga Bayern season TSV Rain came last in the league in 2013–14 and was relegated from the league, now to the Bayernliga Süd, the southern division of the Bayernliga. The club bounced back immediately, winning the league and earning promotion back to the Regionalliga, largely made possible by the 50 season goals scored by Sebastian Kinzel.

Rain finished last in the Regionalliga in 2015–16 and was relegated to the Bayernliga again.

== Honours ==
The club's honours:

=== League ===
- Bayernliga Süd (V)
  - Champions: 2015
  - Runners-up: 2019
- Bezirksoberliga Schwaben (VI)
  - Champions: 1997
- Bezirksliga Schwaben-Nord (V–VII)
  - Champions: (3) 1975, 1981, 1995
- A-Klasse Schwaben
  - Champions: (3) 1962, 1974, 1986
- B-Klasse Schwaben
  - Champions: (3) 1951, 1954, 1989
- 2nd Kreisklasse Schwaben
  - Champions: (7) 1925, 1929, 1930, 1935, 1937, 1939, 1949

=== Cup ===
- Bavarian Cup
  - Runners-up: 2000
- Schwaben Cup
  - Winners: 2000

== Stadium ==
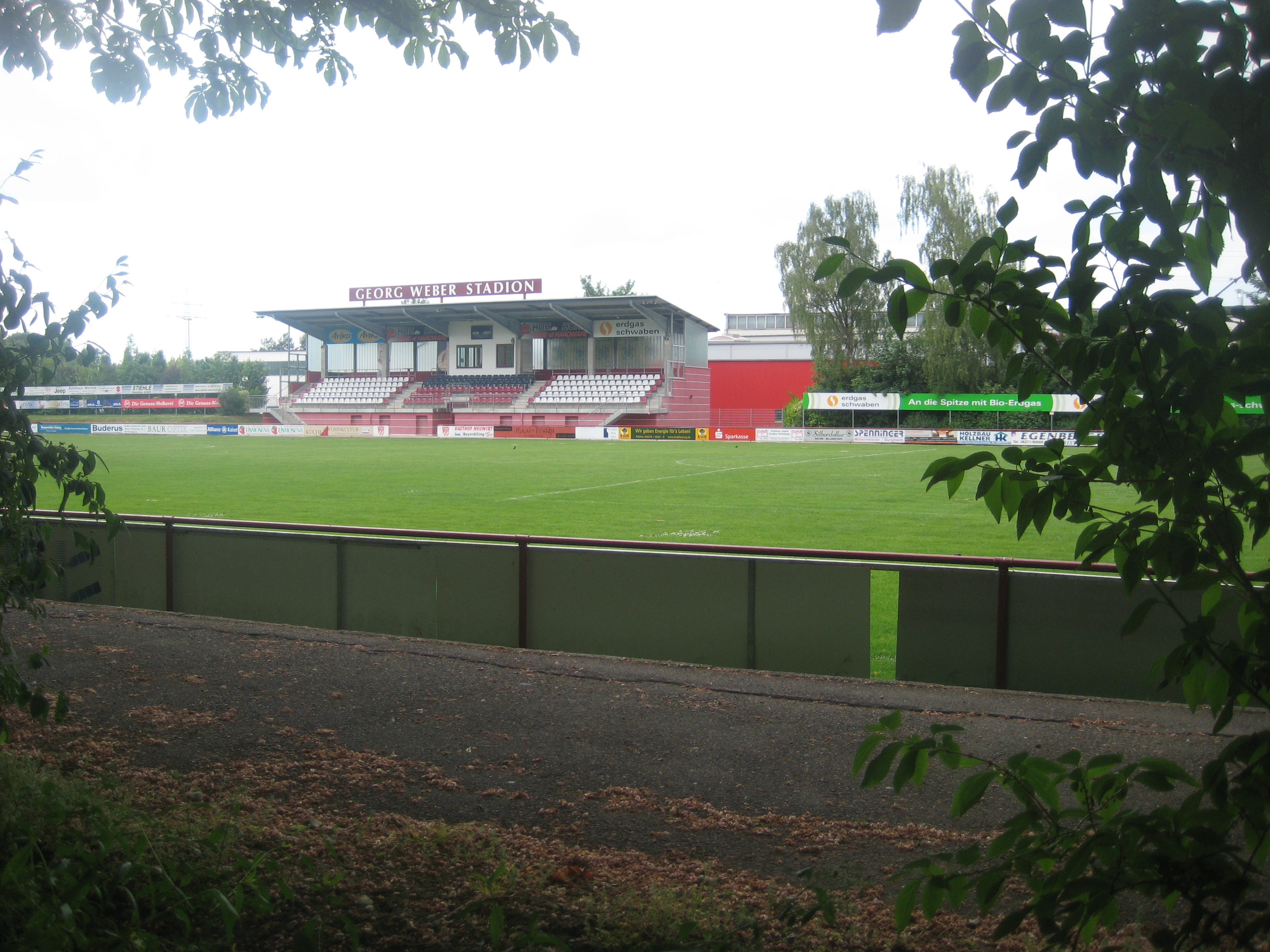
The Georg Weber Stadium.

The Georg-Weber-Stadion is named after Georg Weber, a former club chairman and the founder of Dehner, a local company which sponsors the club. It holds approximately 2,700 spectators.

The stadium is used for relegation and promotion games as well, which have to be held on neutral grounds. In 2007, it also hosted the Schwaben Cup final between TSV 1861 Nördlingen and FC Augsburg II.

== Recent managers ==
Recent managers of the club:

Manager	Start	Finish
Kurt Kowarz	1 January 2009	30 June 2011
Tobias Luderschmid	1 July 2011	20 August 2013
Jens Meckert	21 August 2013	6 October 2013
Stefan Tutschka	8 October 2013	30 June 2014
Herbert Zanker	1 July 2014	31 December 2014
Jürgen Steib	1 January 2015	17 February 2016
Tobias Luderschmid	18 February 2016	Present

== Recent seasons ==
The recent season-by-season performance of the club:

Season	Division	Tier	Position
1999–2000	Landesliga Bayern-Süd	V	4th
2000–01	Landesliga Bayern-Süd	V	10th
2001–02	Landesliga Bayern-Süd	V	10th
2002–03	Landesliga Bayern-Süd	V	7th
2003–04	Landesliga Bayern-Süd	V	5th
2004–05	Landesliga Bayern-Süd	V	3rd
2005–06	Landesliga Bayern-Süd	V	7th
2006–07	Landesliga Bayern-Süd	V	3rd
2007–08	Landesliga Bayern-Süd	V	3rd ↑
2008–09	Bayernliga	V	16th
2009–10	Bayernliga	V	5th
2010–11	Bayernliga	V	12th
2011–12	Bayernliga	V	5th ↑
2012–13	Regionalliga Bayern	IV	11th
2013–14	Regionalliga Bayern	IV	19th ↓
2014–15	Bayernliga Süd	V	1st ↑
2015–16	Regionalliga Bayern	IV	18th ↓
2016–17	Bayernliga Süd	V	10th
2017–18	Bayernliga Süd	V	3rd

- With the introduction of the Bezirksoberligas in 1988 as the new fifth tier, below the Landesligas, all leagues below dropped one tier. With the introduction of the Regionalligas in 1994 and the 3. Liga in 2008 as the new third tier, below the 2. Bundesliga, all leagues below dropped one tier. With the establishment of the Regionalliga Bayern as the new fourth tier in Bavaria in 2012 the Bayernliga was split into a northern and a southern division, the number of Landesligas expanded from three to five and the Bezirksoberligas abolished. All leagues from the Bezirksligas onwards were elevated one tier.

↑ Promoted	↓ Relegated

== DFB-Pokal appearances ==
The club has qualified for the first round of the DFB-Pokal only once:

Season	Round	Date	Home	Away	Result	Attendance
2000–01 DFB-Pokal	First round	27 August 2000	TSV Rain am Lech	FC Schalke 04	0–7	6,000
