= SV Seligenporten =

German football club

- Full name: Spielverein Seligenporten e.V.
- Nickname(s): Die Klosterer
- Founded: 1949
- Ground: MAR Arena
- Capacity: 5,000
- Chairman: Walter Eisl
- Manager: Florian Schlicker
- League: Bayernliga Nord (V)
- 2017–18: Regionalliga Bayern, 18th (relegated)
Home colours	Away colours

SV Seligenporten is a German association football club from Pyrbaum, Bavaria. It is part of a sportsclub established 23 July 1949 which also has departments for handball, Ju-Jitsu, horseback riding, dancing, singing, and women's recreational sport.

== History ==
The footballers first rose above amateur level in Middle Franconia when they earned promotion to the Landesliga Bayern-Mitte (V) in 2004. The enjoyed a successful 2006–07 campaign that saw them beat FC Augsburg II 3–0 on their way to a 1–0 win over Würzburger FV in the final of the Bavarian Cup. This earned the club an appearance in the opening round of the DFB-Pokal (German Cup) where they were eliminated 0–2 by Bundesliga side Arminia Bielefeld.

In the 2007–08 season, a second place in the Landesliga allowed the club to move up to the Oberliga Bayern. Like with their promotion in 2004, they finished runners-up to the FSV Erlangen-Bruck.

SVS experienced a difficult 2008–09 season and had to continue its fight for Bayernliga survival in the post-season, having finished on equal points with Würzburger FV (14th) and TSV Rain am Lech (16th) and therefore requiring a set of deciders to be played. After losing to Rain 5–1 and beating Würzburg 4–0, the team had to face FC Affing in the promotion/relegation round. A 3–0 victory over Affing put the club into the final, where it faced SpVgg Landshut and won 1–0, retaining its Bayernliga status.

At the end of the 2011–12 season the club managed to finish in the top nine of the Bayernliga and thereby directly qualified for the new tier four Regionalliga Bayern. After three seasons in the league, with a seventh place in 2014 as its best result, the club finished seventeenth in 2014–15 and was relegated from the league but won the Bayernliga Nord in 2015–16 and made a direct return to the Regionalliga where it played until relegation in 2018.

== Honors ==
The club's honours:

=== League ===
- Bayernliga Nord (V)
  - Champions: 2016
- Landesliga Bayern-Mitte (V)
  - Runners-up: 2008
- Bezirksoberliga Mittelfranken (VI)
  - Runners-up: 2004
- Bezirksliga Mittelfranken-Süd (VII)
  - Champions: 2001

=== Cup ===
- Bavarian Cup
  - Winners: 2007
- Mittelfranken Cup
  - Winners: 2007

== Recent seasons ==
The recent season-by-season performance of the club:

Season	Division	Tier	Position
1999–2000	Bezirksliga Mittelfranken-Süd	VII	7th
2000–01	Bezirksliga Mittelfranken-Süd	VII	1st ↑
2001–02	Bezirksoberliga Mittelfranken	VI	13th
2002–03	Bezirksoberliga Mittelfranken	VI	13th
2003–04	Bezirksoberliga Mittelfranken	VI	2nd ↑
2004–05	Landesliga Bayern-Mitte	V	6th
2005–06	Landesliga Bayern-Mitte	V	6th
2006–07	Landesliga Bayern-Mitte	V	4th
2007–08	Landesliga Bayern-Mitte	V	2nd ↑
2008–09	Bayernliga	V	15th
2009–10	Bayernliga	V	6th
2010–11	Bayernliga	V	6th
2011–12	Bayernliga	V	6th ↑
2012–13	Regionalliga Bayern	IV	14th
2013–14	Regionalliga Bayern	IV	7th
2014–15	Regionalliga Bayern	IV	17th ↓
2015–16	Bayernliga Nord	V	1st ↑
2016–17	Regionalliga Bayern	IV	16th
2017–18	Regionalliga Bayern	IV	18th ↓

- With the introduction of the Bezirksoberligas in 1988 as the new fifth tier, below the Landesligas, all leagues below dropped one tier. With the introduction of the Regionalligas in 1994 and the 3. Liga in 2008 as the new third tier, below the 2. Bundesliga, all leagues below dropped one tier. With the establishment of the Regionalliga Bayern as the new fourth tier in Bavaria in 2012 the Bayernliga was split into a northern and a southern division, the number of Landesligas expanded from three to five and the Bezirksoberligas abolished. All leagues from the Bezirksligas onward were elevated one tier.

↑ Promoted	↓ Relegated

== Recent managers ==
Recent managers of the club:

Manager	Start	Finish
Karsten Wettberg	April 2009	30 June 2013
Florian Schlicker	1 July 2013	

== DFB Cup appearances ==
The club has qualified for the first round of the German Cup just once:

Season	Round	Date	Home	Away	Result	Attendance
DFB-Pokal 2007–08	First round	5 August 2007	SV Seligenporten	Arminia Bielefeld	0–2	3,500

Source:"DFB-Pokal" (in German). Weltfussball.de.
