= FC Ismaning =

German football club

- Full name: Fußball-Club Ismaning e.V.
- Nickname: FCI
- Founded: 1921
- Ground: Stadion an der Lindenstraße/Prof Erich Greipl Stadion
- Capacity: 5,000
- Chairman: Günter Glasner
- Manager: Rainer Elflinger
- League: Bayernliga Süd (V)
- 2025–26: Bayernliga Süd, 12th of 17
Home colours	Away colours

FC Ismaning is a German association football club based in Ismaning by Munich, Bavaria.

== History ==
The 700 member club was founded in March 1921 and played in lower-tier competition until the mid-90s when the footballers advanced for the first time to the Landesliga Bayern-Süd (V). Ismaning enjoyed its most successful season to date in 1999–2000 when it took the Landesliga title to move up to the Oberliga Bayern (IV) and also captured the Bavarian Cup. The regional cup win led to the side's participation in the DFB-Pokal (German Cup) tournament where it was put out by Bundesliga club Borussia Dortmund (0–4) in the first round. The team has played in the fourth tier for seven seasons and earned three consecutive third-place results from 2003 to 2005. After this, the club's fortunes took a dive with a 14th-place finish in 2006–07, when relegation was narrowly avoided. The 2007–08 season saw improvement however when the club finished tenth in the Oberliga. In 2009–10, the club showed its best performance in the league yet, finishing second.

They won the Bayernliga on 21 May 2011 with a 4–1 win at home to SV Seligenporten but declined to apply for a Regionalliga licence and were therefore not promoted. At the end of the 2011–12 season the club managed to finish in the top nine of the Bayernliga and thereby directly qualified for the new tier four Regionalliga Bayern. In the 2012–13 season the club struggled in the bottom region of the table all season and was eventually relegated back to the Bayernliga. Ismaning finished last in the Bayernliga in 2013–14 and was relegated after losing to TuS Holzkirchen in the relegation round. After two seasons in the Landesliga a division title in 2015–16 took the club back up to the Bayernliga.

FC Ismaning plays its home fixtures in the Stadion an der Lindenstraße (capacity 5,000).

== Honours ==
The club's honours:

=== League ===
- Bayernliga (V)
  - Champions 2011
  - Runners-up: 2010
- Landesliga Bayern-Süd (V)
  - Champions: 2000
- Landesliga Bayern-Südost (VI)
  - Champions: 2016
- Bezirksoberliga Oberbayern (VI)
  - Runners-up: 1996
- Bezirksliga Oberbayern-Nord (VI)
  - Runners-up: 1989
- Bezirksliga Oberbayern-Ost (VI)
  - Champions: 1994

=== Cup ===
- Bavarian Cup
  - Winner: 2000
- Oberbayern Cup
  - Winner: 2000

== Recent managers ==
Recent managers of the club:

Manager	Start	Finish
Toni Plattner	February 1992	30 June 1999
Willi Bierofka	1 July 1999	30 June 2003
Herbert Sitter	1 July 2003	8 September 2005
Bernhard Winkler	1 August 2005	31 October 2005
Mario Himsl	28 October 2005	2 October 2006
Bernd Weiß	3 October 2006	30 December 2008
Jorg Kurth	30 December 2008	30 June 2009
Frank Schmöller	1 July 2009	2 January 2013
Roman Grill	3 January 2013	19 November 2013
Xhevat Muriqi	20 November 2013	30 June 2017
Rainer Elfinger	1 July 2017	24 August 2018
Mijo Stijepic	25 August 2018	4 October 2023
Xhevat Muriqi	5 October 2023	Present

== Recent seasons ==
The recent season-by-season performance of the club:

Season	Division	Tier	Position
1999–2000	Landesliga Bayern-Süd	V	1st ↑
2000–01	Bayernliga	IV	8th
2001–02	Bayernliga	IV	11th
2002–03	Bayernliga	IV	3rd
2003–04	Bayernliga	IV	3rd
2004–05	Bayernliga	IV	3rd
2005–06	Bayernliga	IV	6th
2006–07	Bayernliga	IV	14th
2007–08	Bayernliga	IV	10th
2008–09	Bayernliga	V	11th
2009–10	Bayernliga	V	2nd
2010–11	Bayernliga	V	1st
2011–12	Bayernliga	V	9th ↑
2012–13	Regionalliga Bayern	IV	19th ↓
2013–14	Bayernliga Süd	V	18th ↓
2014–15	Landesliga Bayern-Südost	VI	8th
2015–16	Landesliga Bayern-Südost	VI	1st ↑
2016–17	Bayernliga Süd	V	11th
2017–18	Bayernliga Süd	V	11th
2018–19	Bayernliga Süd	V	15th
2019–21	Bayernliga Süd	V	10th
2021–22	Bayernliga Süd	V	6th
2022-23	Bayernliga Süd	V	10th
2023–24	Bayernliga Süd	V	13th
2024-25	Bayernliga Süd	V	13th
2025–26	Bayernliga Süd	V	12th

- With the introduction of the Bezirksoberligas in 1988 as the new fifth tier, below the Landesligas, all leagues below dropped one tier. With the introduction of the Regionalligas in 1994 and the 3. Liga in 2008 as the new third tier, below the 2. Bundesliga, all leagues below dropped one tier. With the establishment of the Regionalliga Bayern as the new fourth tier in Bavaria in 2012 the Bayernliga was split into a northern and a southern division, the number of Landesligas expanded from three to five and the Bezirksoberligas abolished. All leagues from the Bezirksligas onwards were elevated one tier.

↑ Promoted	↓ Relegated

== DFB-Pokal appearances ==
The club has qualified for the first round of the DFB-Pokal just once:

Season	Round	Date	Home	Away	Result	Attendance
2000–01 DFB-Pokal	First round	26 August 2000	FC Ismaning	Borussia Dortmund	0–4	

Source:"DFB-Pokal" (in German). Weltfussball.de.
