= TSG Thannhausen =

German football club

- Full name: Turn- und Sportgemeinschaft von 1890 Thannhausen e. V.
- Founded: 1 January 1890
- Ground: Mindelstadion
- Chairman: Gerd Olbrich
- Manager: Jurgen Brüller
- League: Bezirksliga Schwaben-Süd (VII)
- 2017–18: Kreisliga Schwaben (VIII), 1st (promoted)
Home colours	Away colours

TSG Thannhausen is a German association football club located in Thannhausen, Bavaria.

== Home ground ==
Mindelstadion serves as the home ground for the local sports club TSG Thannhausen located in Thannhausen, Germany. The venue can accommodate up to 3,000 spectators. It is a multi-purpose football and athletics stadium, featuring a natural grass football pitch surrounded by and althletics running track.The stadium famously hosted a first-round DFB-Pokal match in September 2006 where TSG Thanhaussen faced Bundesliga club Borruisa Dortmund.

== Overview ==
TSG Thannhausen traces its earliest origins as an organization to 1862, first as a gymnastics club and then later as a gymnastics club and fire brigade as required by local bylaw. The club's recognized founding date is 1890, with the football section established in the 1920s. The association collapsed in 1943 due to the pressures brought on by World War II, but was re-established after the conflict on 14 July 1947.

Thannhausen was one of the few teams below the third division to qualify for the 2006–07 DFB-Pokal. The club played host to Bundesliga giants Borussia Dortmund in a first round cup match, losing 3–0. Their only previous appearance in the DFB-Pokal was a 6–0 defeat to Bayer Leverkusen in the first round in 1975.

For most of its history, the club existed in the lower levels of the Schwaben league system, its only bright moments being back-to-back Schwaben Cup wins in 1974 and 1975. In 1965 and 1971, the club achieved promotion from the A-Klasse to the Bezirksliga, from 1971 onwards the club always stayed in the Bezirksliga or higher. In 1984 and 1985, the club came close to promotion to the Landesliga, both years losing the promotion deciders.

The club made a single season appearance in the Landesliga Bayern-Süd (V) in 1990–91 before returning to fifth-tier play in 2001, being relegated to the Bezirksoberliga Schwaben. The next decade saw the club moving between Bezirksoberliga and Bezirksliga, before regaining its Landesliga status in 2001, for two more seasons, before being relegated again. The club bounced right back however, winning its third promotion to the Landesliga in 2004. After a second place Landesliga result in 2007, Thannhausen advanced to the Bayernliga (IV) for the first time, winning the promotion round, becoming the 99th team to play in this league since 1963. A series of good results in spring 2008 put TSG in contention for promotion to the Regionalliga Süd, the excellent seventh-place finish at the end of season was, however, not quite good enough to archive this. After two good seasons in the league, 2009–10 proved unsuccessful, with the team finishing 18th and being relegated back to the Landesliga. After four seasons in the Landesliga TSG suffered another relegation, now to the Bezirksliga. A last-place finish in 2015–16 caused the club to be relegated once more, now to the Kreisliga. A title in 2018 bounced TSG back to the Bezirksliga.

In addition to its football side, the current day sports club boasts over 1,100 members with departments for athletics, gymnastics, table tennis, volleyball, and winter sports.

== Honours ==
The club's honours:

=== League ===
- Kreisliga Schwaben (VIII)
  - Champions: 2018
- Landesliga Bayern-Süd (V)
  - Runners-up: (2) 2006, 2007
- Bezirksoberliga Schwaben (V-VI)
  - Champions: 1990
  - Runners-up: (2) 2001, 2004
- Bezirksliga Schwaben-Nord
  - Champions: (2) 1989, 1998

=== Cup ===
- Bavarian Cup
  - Winners: 2006
- Schwaben Cup
  - Winners: (3) 1974, 1975, 2006
  - Runners-up: (2) 1984, 2005

== Recent seasons ==
The recent season-by-season performance of the club:

Season	Division	Tier	Position
1988–89	Bezirksliga Schwaben-Nord	VI	1st ↑
1989–90	Bezirksoberliga Schwaben	V	1st ↑
1990–91	Landesliga Bayern-Süd	IV	17th ↓
1991–92	Bezirksoberliga Schwaben	V	6th
1992–93	Bezirksoberliga Schwaben	V	14th ↓
1993–94	Bezirksliga Schwaben-Nord	VI	3rd ↑
1994–95	Bezirksoberliga Schwaben	VI	13th ↓
1995–96	Bezirksliga Schwaben-Nord	VII	3rd
1996–97	Bezirksliga Schwaben-Nord	VII	6th
1997–98	Bezirksliga Schwaben-Nord	VII	1st ↑
1998–99	Bezirksoberliga Schwaben	VI	12th
1999–2000	Bezirksoberliga Schwaben	VI	8th
2000–01	Bezirksoberliga Schwaben	VI	2nd ↑
2001–02	Landesliga Bayern-Süd	V	12th
2002–03	Landesliga Bayern-Süd	V	18th ↓

Season	Division	Tier	Position
2003–04	Bezirksoberliga Schwaben	VI	2nd ↑
2004–05	Landesliga Bayern-Süd	V	9th
2005–06	Landesliga Bayern-Süd	V	2nd
2006–07	Landesliga Bayern-Süd	V	2nd ↑
2007–08	Bayernliga	IV	7th
2008–09	Bayernliga	V	9th
2009–10	Bayernliga	V	18th ↓
2010–11	Landesliga Bayern-Süd	VI	12th
2011–12	Landesliga Bayern-Süd	VI	18th
2012–13	Landesliga Bayern-Südwest	VI	10th
2013–14	Landesliga Bayern-Südwest	VI	15th ↓
2014–15	Bezirksliga Schwaben-Süd	VII	10th
2015–16	Bezirksliga Schwaben-Süd	VII	16th ↓
2016–17	Kreisliga Schwaben	VIII	19th
2017–18	Kreisliga Schwaben	VIII	1st ↑

- With the introduction of the Bezirksoberligas in 1988 as the new fifth tier, below the Landesligas, all leagues below dropped one tier. With the introduction of the Regionalligas in 1994 and the 3. Liga in 2008 as the new third tier, below the 2. Bundesliga, all leagues below dropped one tier. With the establishment of the Regionalliga Bayern as the new fourth tier in Bavaria in 2012 the Bayernliga was split into a northern and a southern division, the number of Landesligas expanded from three to five and the Bezirksoberligas abolished. All leagues from the Bezirksligas onward were elevated one tier.

↑ Promoted	↓ Relegated

== DFB Cup appearances ==
The club has qualified for the first round of the German Cup twice:

Season	Round	Date	Home	Away	Result	Attendance
DFB-Pokal 1975–76	First round	1 August 1975	TSG Thannhausen	Bayer 04 Leverkusen	0–6	4,000
DFB-Pokal 2006–07	First round	9 September 2006	TSG Thannhausen	Borussia Dortmund	0–3	10,500

Source:"DFB-Pokal" (in German). Weltfussball.de.
