= SSV Jahn Regensburg =

German association football club based in Regensburg, Bavaria

- Full name: Sport- und Schwimmverein; Jahn Regensburg e. V.
- Nicknames: Die Jahnelf (the Jahn Eleven); Die Rothosen (the Red Shorts)
- Founded: 4 October 1907; 119 years ago
- Ground: Jahnstadion Regensburg
- Capacity: 15,210
- Chairman: Hans Rothammer
- Coach: Sascha Hildmann
- League: 3. Liga
- 2025–26: 3. Liga, 13th of 20
- Website: ssv-jahn.de
| Home colours | Away colours | Third colours |

Sport- und Schwimmverein Jahn Regensburg e. V., commonly known as SSV Jahn Regensburg, Jahn Regensburg, SSV Jahn or simply Jahn, is a German football club based in Regensburg, Bavaria.

The club has played their home games at Jahnstadion Regensburg since 2015. The club colours are white and red, the team's most common nicknames 'Rothosen' (Red Shorts) and 'Jahnelf' (Jahn Eleven). Jahn currently plays in the 3. Liga the German third division, having been relegated from the 2024–25 2. Bundesliga.

== History ==
The club is based on a gymnastics club founded in 1886 as Turnerbund Jahn Regensburg which took its name from Friedrich Ludwig Jahn, whose ideas of gymnastics greatly influenced German sport in the 19th century. The football department was created in 1907.

The footballers left their parent club in 1924 to form Sportbund Jahn Regensburg. In 1934, they joined Sportverein 1889 Regensburg and Schwimmverein 1920 Regensburg to form SSV which has departments for athletics, boxing, futsal, gymnastics, handball, kendo and nine-pin bowling. The football department separated in 2000 as SSV Jahn Regensburg.

Despite the 1934 merger of the football section into the wider sports club, the footballing side's best finish in the Bezirksliga Bayern was a second-place finish in 1930. In the Gauliga Bayern, one of sixteen top flight divisions formed in the re-organization of German football under the Third Reich in 1933, Jahn lasted for only two seasons before being relegated in 1935. It returned in 1937 and their best performances were consecutive third-place finishes in 1938 and 1939 after which they became a less competitive mid-to-lower table side.

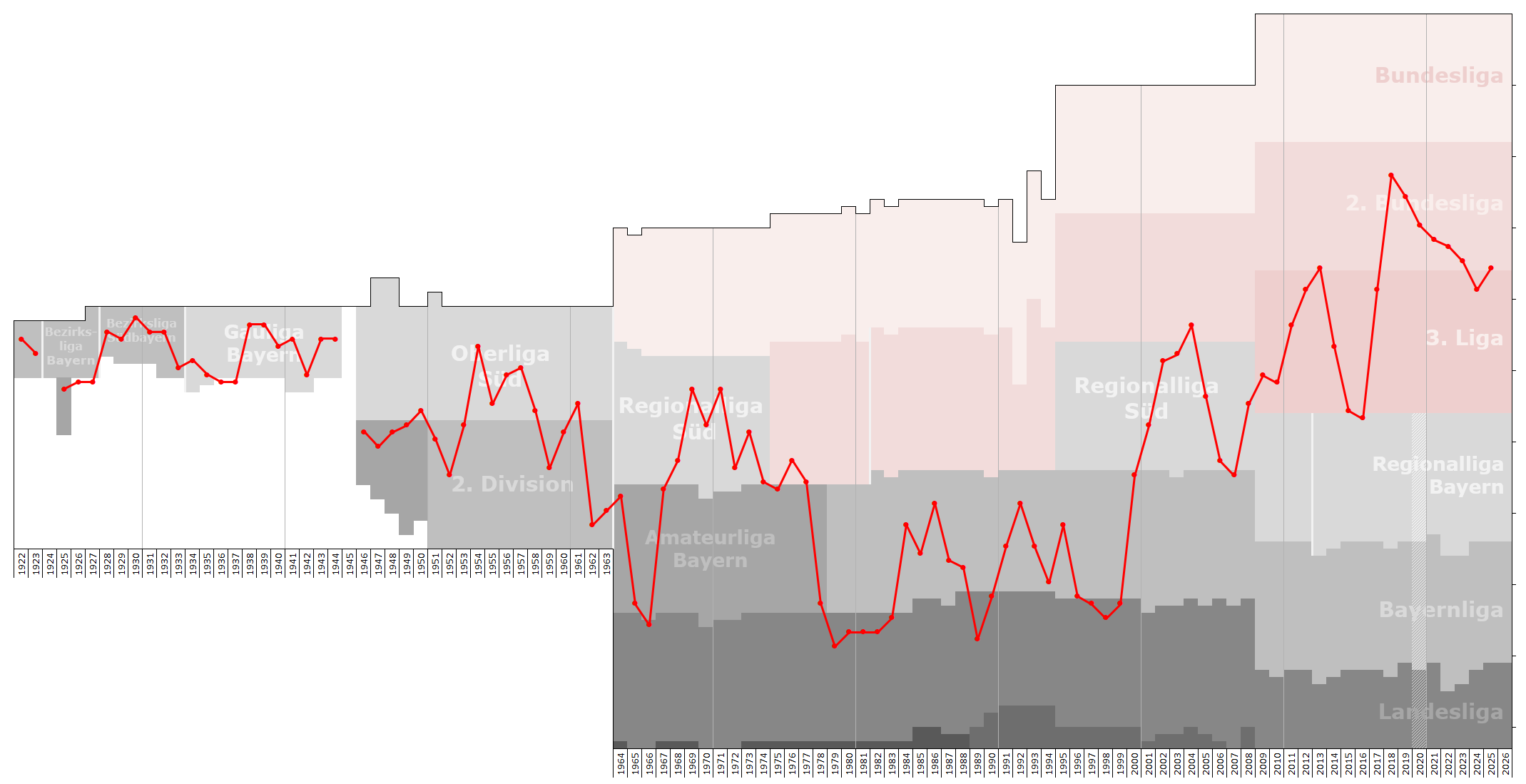
Historical chart of Jahn Regensburg league performance

The club spent most of the period between the end of World War II and the formation of the Bundesliga in 1963 as a "yo-yo team" oscillating between the Oberliga Süd and the second division. Regensburg played the early 1960s in the third division before making their way back to the Regionalliga Süd (II). By the mid-1970s, the team's results worsened and by the end of the decade had become a team mostly playing in the third and fourth divisions, as well as playing three years in the Landesliga Bayern-Mitte, the fifth tier, in the late 1990s.

In 2000 the football team left to become an independent club and were joined by players from SG Post/Süd Regensburg in 2002. Regensburg played in the Regionalliga Süd, the third tier since with a single season in the 2. Bundesliga in 2003–04. However, the club faced financial difficulties and narrowly avoided bankruptcy in 2005. After being relegated to the fourth division, the Oberliga Bayern in 2005–06, Jahn achieved first place in the following season and were promoted back to the Regionalliga Süd. Due to a reorganisation of the leagues, Jahn had to finish in tenth place or higher in order to stay in the third division, which is now the new 3. Liga. Jahn struggled to do so but finished ninth in the end and gained entry to the new league.

The club played its first two seasons in the 3. Liga close to the relegation zone but then improved and came third in 2011–12, qualifying to play against the Karlsruher SC in the promotion round to the 2. Bundesliga. They drew 1–1 at Regensburg and 2–2 at Karlsruhe, which meant Jahn returned to second level after eight years thanks to the away goal rule.

The Jahn finished last in the 2. Bundesliga in 2012–13 and were relegated back to the 3. Liga, finishing eleventh in 2013–14. In 2014–15 they also finished last in the 3. Liga and were relegated back to the Regionalliga. In the following season, they won the Regionalliga Bayern and faced the Regionalliga Nord champions VfL Wolfsburg II in the play-offs. The club defeated Wolfsburg II 2–1 on aggregate and immediately returned to third level for the 2015–16 season. The following season Jahn finished third in the 3. Liga. As in 2012, they were subsequently promoted to the second tier via the play-off, defeating 1860 Munich 3–1 on aggregate.

In 2012, head coach Markus Weinzierl left Jahn after securing promotion to the 2. Bundesliga, ending a decade-long stint with the club. His successor, Oscar Corrochano, was sacked within months due to poor results, and subsequent coaches failed to prevent relegation in 2013. After a short stint in the fourth-tier Regionalliga, Regensburg returned to the 3. Liga in 2016 under Heiko Herrlich, achieving back-to-back promotions to the 2. Bundesliga in 2017.

Under Achim Beierlorzer and later Mersad Selimbegović, Jahn established itself in the 2. Bundesliga, achieving notable results despite financial limitations. The team became known for comebacks, earning the nickname Mentalitätsmonster ("Mentality Monster"). A strong DFB-Pokal run in 2020–21, reaching their first ever quarter-finals in the tournament, highlighted their resilience, but performance declined in later seasons.

Relegated again in 2023 after six years in the 2. Bundesliga, the club rebuilt its squad. Despite early dominance in the 3. Liga and a record 10-game win streak, their form dipped dramatically. They narrowly avoided further setbacks, securing promotion through relegation playoffs in 2024. The team dedicated their promotion to their late teammate, Agyemang Diawusie, who had died earlier in the season. Manager Joe Enochs, who led the return to the 2. Bundesliga, was dismissed in October 2024 following poor results, including a heavy 8–3 defeat to 1. FC Nürnberg.

== Players ==
=== Current squad ===
As of 26 September 2026

Note: Flags indicate national team as defined under FIFA eligibility rules; some limited exceptions apply. Players may hold more than one non-FIFA nationality.

| No. | Pos. | Nation | Player |
|---|---|---|---|
| 1 | GK | GER | Hannes Hermann (on loan from Hamburger SV) |
| 4 | DF | AUT | Felix Strauß (captain) |
| 5 | DF | GER | Lukas Mühl |
| 6 | DF | GER | Benedikt Saller |
| 7 | FW | GER | Oscar Schönfelder |
| 8 | MF | GER | David Philipp |
| 9 | FW | GER | Florian Dietz |
| 10 | FW | GER | Nassim Boujellab |
| 11 | FW | GER | Marco Wörner (on loan from SC Paderborn) |
| 13 | MF | GER | Erik Majetschak |
| 14 | DF | GER | Robin Ziegele |
| 19 | FW | GER | Davis Asante |
| 20 | FW | GER | John Posselt |
| 21 | MF | AUT | Zeteny Jano |
| 22 | DF | GER | Sebastian Stolze |

| No. | Pos. | Nation | Player |
|---|---|---|---|
| 23 | GK | GER | Max Schmitt |
| 25 | DF | GER | Nicolas Oliveira |
| 26 | DF | GER | Benedikt Bauer |
| 27 | FW | GER | Lucas Hermes |
| 29 | MF | GER | Adrian Fein |
| 31 | DF | AUT | Leo Mätzler |
| 32 | GK | GER | Alexander Weidinger |
| 34 | FW | GER | Patrick Hobsch |
| 35 | MF | GER | Sascha Hingerl |
| 36 | DF | GER | Ben Kieffer |
| 37 | DF | GER | Leopold Wurm |
| 40 | MF | GER | Jakob Seibold |
| 42 | MF | GER | Arian Dizdarevic |
| 44 | DF | GER | Malte Karbstein |

== Reserve team ==
SSV Jahn Regensburg II (or SSV Jahn Regensburg Amateure) made a single season appearance in the southern division of the Amateurliga Bayern in 1962–63, the last year of the league being divided into two regional divisions. An eleventh place in the league that season was not enough to qualify for the new single-division league and the team also did not become part of the new Landesliga Bayern-Mitte.

A lengthy period in the lower amateur divisions followed until 2002, when the merger of the first team with SG Post/Süd Regensburg allowed the reserve side to take Post's place in the Bayernliga, where the team played from 2002 to 2006. In 2006, the first team's relegation meant, they had to move down one level even so they finished eleventh this season. After three average seasons, the side became a promotion contender again, finishing second in 2010–11, but losing to SpVgg Bayern Hof in the promotion round.

At the end of the 2011–12 season, the club qualified directly for the newly expanded Bayernliga after finishing third in the Landesliga.

== Coaching staff ==
| Position | Name |
|---|---|
| Head Coach | (Germany) Sascha Hildmann |
| Assistant Coach | (Lebanon) Munier Raychouni |
| First-Team Coach & Opponent Analyst | (Germany) Oliver Seitz |
| Goalkeeper Coach | (Germany) Philipp Tschauner |
| Athletic Coach | (Germany) Simon Hecht |
| Chief Scout | (Serbia) Ilija Džepina |
| Scout | (Germany) Andreas Wagner (Germany) Karl Müller |
| Doctor | (Germany) Dr. Andreas Harlass-Neuking |
| Physiotherapist | (Germany) Wolfgang Brummer (Germany) Matthias Günther |
| Lead Academy Physiotherapist | (Germany) Tobias Rutzinger |
| Head of Media and Communications | (Germany) Johannes Liedl |
| Team official | (Germany) Klaus-Dieter Schneider |
| Kit Manager | (Germany) Reinhold Reisinger |
| Head of Finance and Human Resources | (Germany) Simon Leser |
| Head of Private Customer Marketing | (Germany) Cornelius Knappe |
| Head of Operations and Infrastructure | (Germany) Andreas Hahn |
| Team Manager | (Germany) Katja Schöppl |
| Academy Manager | (Germany) Christian Martin |

== Recent managers ==
Recent managers of the club:

| Manager | Start | Finish |
|---|---|---|
| (Germany) Günter Sebert | 1 July 2002 | 30 June 2003 |
| (Germany) Ingo Peter | 1 July 2003 | 17 November 2003 |
| (Germany) Günter Brandl | 18 November 2003 | 30 June 2004 |
| (Germany) Mario Basler | 1 July 2004 | 20 September 2005 |
| (Poland) Dariusz Pasieka | 21 September 2005 | 6 April 2006 |
| (Germany) Günter Güttler | 7 April 2006 | 30 June 2008 |
| (Germany) Thomas Kristl | 1 July 2008 | 24 November 2008 |
| (Germany) Markus Weinzierl | 25 November 2008 | 30 June 2012 |
| (Germany) Oscar Corrochano | 1 July 2012 | 4 November 2012 |
| (Germany) Franz Gerber | 4 November 2012 | 2 January 2013 |
| (Poland) Franciszek Smuda | 2 January 2013 | 10 June 2013 |
| (Greece) Thomas Stratos | 11 June 2013 | 30 June 2014 |
| (Germany) Alexander Schmidt | 1 July 2014 | 10 November 2014 |
| (Germany) Christian Brand | 18 November 2014 | 6 December 2015 |
| (Germany) Heiko Herrlich | 11 January 2016 | 30 June 2017 |
| (Germany) Achim Beierlorzer | 1 July 2017 | 30 June 2019 |
| (Bosnia and Herzegovina) Mersad Selimbegović | 1 July 2019 | 9 May 2023 |
| (United States) Joe Enochs | 10 May 2023 | 27 October 2024 |
| (Germany) Andreas Patz | 27 October 2024 | 8 May 2025 |
| (Lebanon) Munier Raychouni (caretaker) | 8 May 2025 | 30 June 2025 |
| (Germany) Michael Wimmer | 1 July 2025 | 9 March 2026 |
| (Lebanon) Munier Raychouni (caretaker) | 9 March 2026 | 31 March 2026 |
| (Germany) Sascha Hildmann | 31 March 2026 | |

== Recent seasons ==
The recent season-by-season performance of the club:

=== SSV Jahn Regensburg ===
| Season | Division | Tier | Position |
|---|---|---|---|
| 2000–01 | Regionalliga Süd | III | 12th |
| 2001–02 | Regionalliga Süd | III | 3rd |
| 2002–03 | Regionalliga Süd | III | 2nd ↑ |
| 2003–04 | 2. Bundesliga | II | 16th ↓ |
| 2004–05 | Regionalliga Süd | III | 8th |
| 2005–06 | Regionalliga Süd | III | 17th ↓ |
| 2006–07 | Bayernliga | IV | 1st ↑ |
| 2007–08 | Regionalliga Süd | III | 9th |
| 2008–09 | 3. Liga | III | 15th |
| 2009–10 | 3. Liga | III | 16th |
| 2010–11 | 3. Liga | III | 8th |
| 2011–12 | 3. Liga | III | 3rd ↑ |
| 2012–13 | 2. Bundesliga | II | 18th ↓ |
| 2013–14 | 3. Liga | III | 11th |
| 2014–15 | 3. Liga | III | 20th ↓ |
| 2015–16 | Regionalliga Bayern | IV | 1st ↑ |
| 2016–17 | 3. Liga | III | 3rd ↑ |
| 2017–18 | 2. Bundesliga | II | 5th |
| 2018–19 | 2. Bundesliga | II | 8th |
| 2019–20 | 2. Bundesliga | II | 12th |
| 2020–21 | 2. Bundesliga | II | 14th |
| 2021–22 | 2. Bundesliga | II | 15th |
| 2022–23 | 2. Bundesliga | II | 17th ↓ |
| 2023–24 | 3. Liga | III | 3rd ↑ |
| 2024–25 | 2. Bundesliga | II | 18th ↓ |
| 2025–26 | 3. Liga | III | 13th |
| 2026–27 | 3. Liga | III | |

=== SSV Jahn Regensburg II ===
| Season | Division | Tier | Position |
|---|---|---|---|
| 2002–03 | Bayernliga | IV | 11th |
| 2003–04 | Bayernliga | IV | 8th |
| 2004–05 | Bayernliga | IV | 8th |
| 2005–06 | Bayernliga | IV | 11th ↓ |
| 2006–07 | Landesliga Bayern-Mitte | V | 14th |
| 2007–08 | Landesliga Bayern-Mitte | V | 8th |
| 2008–09 | Landesliga Bayern-Mitte | VI | 11th |
| 2009–10 | Landesliga Bayern-Mitte | VI | 3rd |
| 2010–11 | Landesliga Bayern-Mitte | VI | 2nd |
| 2011–12 | Landesliga Bayern-Mitte | VI | 3rd ↑ |
| 2012–13 | Bayernliga Süd | V | 5th |
| 2013–14 | Bayernliga Nord | V | 7th |
| 2014–15 | Bayernliga Nord | V | 6th |
| 2015–16 | Bayernliga Nord | V | 13th |
| 2016–17 | Bayernliga Süd | V | 16th ↓ |
| 2017–18 | Landesliga Bayern-Mitte | VI | 1st ↑ |
| 2018–19 | Bayernliga Süd | V | 3rd |
| 2019–20 | Bayernliga Süd | V | 15th |
| 2020–21 | Bayernliga Süd | V | 12th |
| 2021–22 | Bayernliga Süd | V | 4th |
| 2022–23 | Bayernliga Nord | V | 8th |
| 2023–24 | Bayernliga Nord | V | 12th |
| 2024–25 | Bayernliga Nord | V | 13th |

- With the introduction of the Bezirksoberligas in 1988 as the new fifth tier, below the Landesligas, all leagues below dropped one tier. With the introduction of the Regionalligas in 1994 and the 3. Liga in 2008 as the new third tier, below the 2. Bundesliga, all leagues below dropped one tier. With the establishment of the Regionalliga Bayern as the new fourth tier in Bavaria in 2012 the Bayernliga was split into a northern and a southern division, the number of Landesligas expanded from three to five and the Bezirksoberligas abolished. All leagues from the Bezirksligas onwards were elevated one tier.

Key

| ↑Promoted | ↓ Relegated |

== Honours ==
=== League ===
- 2. Oberliga Süd (II)
  - Champions: 1953
- Bayernliga (II–III–IV)
  - Champions: 1949, 1967, 1975, 2000, 2007
  - Runners-up: 1946, 1964
- Bayernliga South (II)
  - Runners-up: 1947, 1948
- Landesliga Bayern-Mitte (IV)
  - Champions: 1966, 1983, 1990
  - Runners-up: 1997, 2011^{‡}
- 2. Amateurliga Niederbayern (IV)
  - Champions: 1962^{‡}

=== Cup ===
- Bavarian Cup
  - Winners: 1947, 1948, 2001, 2004^{‡}, 2005, 2010, 2011
  - Runners-up: 2002
- Oberpfalz Cup
  - Winners: 2001, 2002, 2003, 2004^{‡}, 2006

=== Youth ===
- Under 19 Bayernliga
  - Winners: 2005, 2007
  - Runners-up: 2013
- Under 17 Bayernliga
  - Winners: 2007
  - Runners-up: 2003
- Under 15 Bayernliga
  - Winners: 2015
  - Runners-up: 2005, 2012
- ^{‡} Reserve team
