= Alemannia Haibach =

German football club

- Full name: Sportverein 1919 Alemannia Haibach e.V.
- Founded: 1919
- Ground: Stadion am Hohen Kreuz
- Capacity: 1,200
- Chairman: Angel Aleman
- Manager: Slobodan Komljenović
- League: Landesliga Bayern-Nordwest (VI)
- 2018–19: 5th
Home colours	Away colours

The Alemannia Haibach is a German association football club from the town of Haibach, Bavaria.

The club's most notable moment came in 1996–97, when it spent a season in the tier four Fußball-Bayernliga. It also once qualified for German Cup play in 1979 but was knocked out in the first round by VfL Frohnlach in an 8–4 loss after extra time.

== History ==
Founded in 1919, Alemannia Haibach spent most of its existence as a lower tier amateur side in regional football. It appeared only once on the national football scene, when it qualified for the first round of the DFB-Pokal, the German Cup, in 1979. The club was drawn against fellow northern Bavarian amateur side VfL Frohnlach and the two teams played a memorable match, in which Frohnlach lead 4–1 after 66 minutes, followed by Haibach scoring three goals in eight minutes to equalise and force extra time. In the second half of extra time, Frohnlach scored four unanswered goals to finish the game 8–4 in their favour.

Alemannia was not a founding member of the Bezirksoberliga Unterfranken (V) in 1988, but won promotion to the league in 1992, by way of an undefeated championship season in the Bezirksliga Unterfranken-West (VI). They finished third in their first year there, followed by a league championship and promotion in the following year.

The club was an instant success in the Landesliga Bayern-Nord (V), coming second in 1995. This qualified the side for the promotion round to the Bayernliga, but a 2–1 loss to FC Enikon Augsburg in the semi-finals stalled its ambitions. The following year, 1995–96, Alemannia repeated its second place in the Landesliga, but this time it followed it up with promotion round success, defeating VfB Helmbrechts 2–0 in extra time to earn a place in the Bayernliga for the first time.

The club did not adapt well to the new league, winning only six out of 34 games, coming second-last, eleven points clear of salvation.

Back in the Landesliga, the club looked like it would fall as quickly as it rose, being relegated immediately to the Bezirksoberliga. Alemannia finished in second place in the league in 1999 however, broke the fall and bounced back to the Landesliga.

After returning to the Landesliga, the club managed to stay out of relegation trouble, except for its first season back and came close to another promotion in 2007 when it finished second in the league once more, but a loss to TSG Thannhausen in the promotion round dashed those hopes once more. In most seasons, the club has finished in the top six of the league and continued to play in the Landesliga in 2011–12.

At the end of the 2011–12 season the club qualified for the promotion round to the newly expanded Bayernliga and managed to return to this level after victories over TG Höchberg and ASV Rimpar. Haibach finished 16th at the end of the 2013–14 season but managed to successfully retain its Bayernliga spot in the relegation round.

== Honours ==
The club's honours:

=== League ===
- Landesliga Bayern-Nord
  - Runners-up: 1995, 1996, 2007
- Bezirksoberliga Unterfranken
  - Champions: 1994
  - Runners-up: 1999
- Bezirksliga Unterfranken-West
  - Champions: 1992

=== Cup ===
- Unterfranken Cup
  - Winners: 2002, 2008
  - Runners-up: 2001, 2003, 2007

== Recent managers ==
Recent managers of the club:

Manager	Start	Finish
Joachim Hufgard	?	30 June 2013
Volker Sedlacek	1 July 2013	4 November 2013
Joachim Hufgard	5 November 2013	December 2013
Klaus Hildenbeutel	January 2014	Present

== Recent seasons ==
The recent season-by-season performance of the club:

Season	Division	Tier	Position
1999–2000	Landesliga Bayern-Nord	V	13th
2000–01	Landesliga Bayern-Nord	V	4th
2001–02	Landesliga Bayern-Nord	V	10th
2002–03	Landesliga Bayern-Nord	V	6th
2003–04	Landesliga Bayern-Nord	V	5th
2004–05	Landesliga Bayern-Nord	V	6th
2005–06	Landesliga Bayern-Nord	V	10th
2006–07	Landesliga Bayern-Nord	V	2nd
2007–08	Landesliga Bayern-Nord	V	4th
2008–09	Landesliga Bayern-Nord	VI	3rd
2009–10	Landesliga Bayern-Nord	VI	4th
2010–11	Landesliga Bayern-Nord	VI	6th
2011–12	Landesliga Bayern-Nord	VI	9th ↑
2012–13	Bayernliga Nord	V	10th
2013–14	Bayernliga Nord	V	16th
2014–15	Bayernliga Nord	V	12th
2015–16	Bayernliga Nord	V	6th
2016–17	Bayernliga Nord	V	

- With the introduction of the Bezirksoberligas in 1988 as the new fifth tier, below the Landesligas, all leagues below dropped one tier. With the introduction of the Regionalligas in 1994 and the 3. Liga in 2008 as the new third tier, below the 2. Bundesliga, all leagues below dropped one tier. With the establishment of the Regionalliga Bayern as the new fourth tier in Bavaria in 2012 the Bayernliga was split into a northern and a southern division, the number of Landesligas expanded from three to five and the Bezirksoberligas abolished. All leagues from the Bezirksligas onwards were elevated one tier.

↑ Promoted	↓ Relegated

== DFB Cup appearances ==
The club has qualified for the first round of the German Cup just once:

Season	Round	Date	Home	Away	Result	Attendance
1979–80	First round	26 August 1979	VfL Frohnlach	Alemannia Haibach	8–4 aet	1,500
