= VfL Frohnlach =

German football club

- Full name: Verein für Leibesübungen 1919 e. V. Frohnlach
- Founded: 1919
- Ground: Willi-Schillig-Stadion
- Capacity: 5,000
- Chairman: Willi Schillig
- Manager: Oliver Müller
- League: Bayernliga Nord (V)
- 2015–16: 17th
Home colours	Away colours

VfL Frohnlach is a German association football club from the municipality of Frohnlach in Ebersdorf bei Coburg, Bavaria.

== History ==
The club was established as Sports Club Arminia Frohnlach in 1919 and, after a 1925 merger with Turnverein Frohnlach, became Verein für Leibesübungen 1919 e. V. Frohnlach. In addition to fielding a football side the sports club had departments for cycling, fistball, and gymnastics. Like other clubs that were part of the Arbeiter-Turn- und -Sportbundes (Worker's Gymnastics and Sports Union) VfL was banned in 1933 by the Nazi regime as politically undesirable. After World War II it was re-established as TV Frohnlach and before the end of 1945 was playing as Allgemeine Sportvereinigung Frohnlach. By 1948 the association was again known as VfL.

The footballers took part in lower level local play in the Coburg district league, until the mid-70s when the club made a rapid ascent with the support of local furniture maker Willi Schillig, who took on the presidency and a major sponsorship role. Three consecutive promotions from 1978 to 1980 saw the club through to the fourth division Bayernliga. They also made their first appearance in DFB-Pokal (German Cup) play in 1980 where they were put out in the second round by Stuttgarter Kickers (0:9). Frohnlach enjoyed a decade long run in the Bayernliga until slipping to become an elevator side, moving frequently up and down between fourth- and fifth-tier play. The team competed as an Bayernliga side in 1992–93, 1994–99, and 2004–07. Their most current result, a 16th-place finish, saw the club sent down to the Landesliga Bayern-Nord (V), where they finished on top and returned to the Bayernliga for the 2008–09 season.

After another relegation in 2010 the club promptly bounced back and won the Landesliga title for a fifth time in 2011. At the end of the 2011–12 season the club managed to finish in the top nine of the Bayernliga and thereby directly qualified for the new tier four Regionalliga Bayern. In the 2012–13 season the club struggled in the bottom region of the table all season and was eventually relegated back to the Bayernliga. Frohnlach had to enter the relegation round in the 2015–16 Bayernliga season and, after two losses against Würzburger Kickers II, was initially relegated but was awarded another opportunity by having to face SV Erlbach for one more Bayernliga spot where the club successfully defended its league place.

== Honours ==
=== League ===
- Landesliga Bayern-Nord (V)
  - Champions: (5) 1980, 1992, 2004, 2008, 2011
  - Runners-up: (2) 1991, 2002

=== Cup ===
- Oberfranken Cup
  - Winner: (3) 2003, 2005, 2009

== Recent managers ==
Recent managers of the club:

Manager	Start	Finish
Manfred Müller	1 July 2007	17 April 2007
Werner Gückel	16 April 2007	30 June 2010
Dieter Kurth	1 July 2010	8 October 2012
Andreas Schöll	15 October 2012	29 March 2013
Stefan Braungardt	30 March 2013	30 June 2016
Oliver Müller	1 July 2016	present

== Recent seasons ==
The recent season-by-season performance of the club:

Season	Division	Tier	Position
1999–2000	Landesliga Bayern-Nord	V	3rd
2000–01	Landesliga Bayern-Nord	V	3rd
2001–02	Landesliga Bayern-Nord	V	2nd
2002–03	Landesliga Bayern-Nord	V	3rd
2003–04	Landesliga Bayern-Nord	V	1st ↑
2004–05	Bayernliga	IV	11th
2005–06	Bayernliga	IV	7th
2006–07	Bayernliga	IV	16th ↓
2007–08	Landesliga Bayern-Nord	V	1st ↑
2008–09	Bayernliga	V	7th
2009–10	Bayernliga	V	16th ↓
2010–11	Landesliga Bayern-Nord	VI	1st ↑
2011–12	Bayernliga	V	7th ↑
2012–13	Regionalliga Bayern	IV	20th ↓
2013–14	Bayernliga Nord	V	11th
2014–15	Bayernliga Nord	V	13th
2015–16	Bayernliga Nord	V	17th
2016–17	Bayernliga Nord	V	

- With the introduction of the Bezirksoberligas in 1988 as the new fifth tier, below the Landesligas, all leagues below dropped one tier. With the introduction of the Regionalligas in 1994 and the 3. Liga in 2008 as the new third tier, below the 2. Bundesliga, all leagues below dropped one tier. With the establishment of the Regionalliga Bayern as the new fourth tier in Bavaria in 2012 the Bayernliga was split into a northern and a southern division, the number of Landesligas expanded from three to five and the Bezirksoberligas abolished. All leagues from the Bezirksligas onwards were elevated one tier.

↑ Promoted	↓ Relegated

== Stadium ==
Between 1958 and 1980 the club played its home matches at Am Wirtsteich until the opening of the Waldstadion (capacity 5,000). The stadium has served as a venue for matches of the German junior national U20 and U21 teams. In 2006 the facility was renamed for club president Willi Schillig.

== DFB Cup appearances ==
The club has qualified for the first round of the German Cup just once:

Season	Round	Date	Home	Away	Result	Attendance
DFB Cup 1979-80	First round	26 August 1979	VfL Frohnlach	Alemannia Haibach	8–4 aet	1,500
DFB Cup 1979-80	Second round	29 September 1979	Stuttgarter Kickers	VfL Frohnlach	9–0	1,800
