= Mittelfranken Cup =

- Folded: 2009
- Country: Germany
- State: Bavaria
- Promotion to: DFB-Pokal (until 1998), Bavarian Cup (from 1998)
- Last champions: SC Eltersdorf (2008–09)

The Mittelfranken Cup (German: Mittelfränkischer Pokal) was a domestic cup competition for the Bavarian Bezirk of Middle Franconia (German: Mittelfranken), played until 2009.

== Modus ==
All senior men's teams from the Middle Franconia region were eligible to compete in the cup, except fully professional sides, meaning clubs in the Bundesliga and 2. Bundesliga. The winner of the Mittelfranken Cup qualified for the DFB-Pokal until 1998 and after they qualified for the Bavarian Cup.

The Mittelfranken Cup in turn sub-divided into three regional cups, these regions being:

- Nürnberg/Frankenhöhe
- Erlangen/Pegnitzgrund
- Neumarkt/Jura

The three winners plus one of the runners-up advanced to the Bezirks semi-finals, the winners of the two semi-finals then advanced to the Bezirks final.

In 2007, the SV Seligenporten became the first team from Middle Franconia to win the Bavarian Cup. In 2008, the SpVgg Ansbach became the second team from the region to reach the Bavarian Cup final.

With the expansion of the Bavarian Cup from 2009–10 onwards, the Mittelfranken Cup ceased to be held.

== Finals since 1975 ==
Season	Winner	Finalist	Result
1974–75	FC Herzogenaurach		
1975–76			
1976–77			
1977–78			
1978–79			
1979–80	TSV Röttenbach		
1980–81	TSV Röttenbach		
1981–82			
1982–83			
1983–84			
1984–85			
1985–86	TSV Vestenbergsgreuth	1. FC Nürnberg II	1–0
1986–87	TSV Vestenbergsgreuth	Südwest Nürnberg	2–1 aet
1987–88	BSC Erlangen		
1988–89	TSV Vestenbergsgreuth	Spvgg Fürth	1–0 aet
1989–90	SpVgg Fürth	TSV Vestenbergsgreuth	
1990–91	SpVgg Fürth	TSV Vestenbergsgreuth	
1991–92			
1992–93			
1993–94	TSV Vestenbergsgreuth	SpVgg Ansbach	6–2
1994–95	1. FC Nürnberg II		
1995–96	SpVgg Fürth	1. SC Feucht	6–0
1996–97	SpVgg Greuther Fürth	1. FC Nürnberg	3–1
1997–98	Jahn Forchheim	1. FC Nürnberg II	
1998–99	SG Quelle Fürth	1. SC Feucht	4–2
1999–2000	FSV Erlangen-Bruck	SC 04 Schwabach	2–1
2000–01	1. FC Nürnberg II	1. SC Feucht	1–1 / 4–3 after pen.
2001–02	SpVgg Greuther Fürth II	SC 04 Schwabach	1–1 / 4–2 after pen.
2002–03	ASV Zirndorf	1. FC Nürnberg II	3–2
2003–04	SC 04 Schwabach	1. FC Nürnberg II	1–0
2004–05	SC 04 Schwabach	SC Eltersdorf	2–2 / 7–6 after pen.
2005–06	1. FC Nürnberg II	SG Quelle Fürth	3–2
2006–07	SV Seligenporten	SpVgg Greuther Fürth II	0–0 / 4–2 after pen.
2007–08	ASV Neumarkt	SpVgg Ansbach	2–0
2008–09	SC Eltersdorf	ASV Neumarkt	2–2 / 6–5 after pen.
