= List of Bayernliga top scorers =

This is the list of Bayernliga top scorers season by season since 1963–64.

Year	Player	Club	Goals
1963–64	Biesinger	BC Augsburg	30
1964–65	Heinz–Herbert Kreh	1. FC Haßfurt	38
1965–66	Heinz–Herbert Kreh	1. FC Haßfurt	30
1965–66	Zettelmaier	1. FC Bamberg	30
1966–67	Größler	SpVgg Bayreuth	34
1967–68	Mansfeld	FC Wacker München	29
1968–69	Größler	SpVgg Bayreuth	35
1969–70	Gerhard Pankotsch	SpVgg Vohenstrauß	28
1970–71	Norbert Knopf	FC Herzogenaurach	29
1971–72	Schöll	ASV Neumarkt	34
1972–73	Norbert Knopf	FC Herzogenaurach	30
1973–74	Seubert	SpVgg Weiden	25
1974–75	Liepert	SC Fürstenfeldbruck	26
1975–76	Kirschner	FC Passau	32
1976–77	Albert	1. FC Haßfurt	30
1977–78	Obermeier	MTV Ingolstadt	36
1978–79	Ehrensberger	FC Bayern Munich Amateure	23
1979–80	Wolfgang Ruhdorfer	FC Augsburg	27
1980–81	Franz Schick	TSV Ampfing	30
1981–82	Franz Schick	TSV Ampfing	29
1982–83	Heinle	TSV Schwaben Augsburg	26
1983–84	Stenzel	SpVgg Landshut	24
1983–84	Spindler	VfL Frohnlach	24
1984–85	Franz Schick	TSV Ampfing	34
1985–86	Franz Schick	TSV Ampfing	34
1986–87	Scheller	SV Heidingsfeld	23
1987–88	Franz Schick	TSV Ampfing	29
1988–89	Andreas Löbmann	TSV 1860 Munich	29
1989–90	Binner	MTV Ingolstadt	23
1989–90	Winkler	FC Schweinfurt 05	23
1990–91	Christian Radlmaier	TSV Eching	29
1991–92	Niklaus	SpVgg Unterhaching	19
1992–93	Steck	FC Memmingen	21
1993–94	Christian Radlmaier	FC Augsburg	22
1994–95	Asbeck	Wacker Burghausen	20
1995–96	Söhner	FC Gundelfingen	18
1995–96	Fiederer	SpVgg Weiden	18
1996–97	Keller	FC Memmingen	26
1997–98			
1998–99	Thomas	SpVgg Bayreuth	24
1999–2000	Endres	Würzburger FV 04	23
2000–01	Gerd Klaus	SG Quelle Fürth	32
2001–02	Rico Hanke	TSV 1860 Munich II	25
2002–03	Stefan Reisinger	SpVgg Greuther Fürth II	26
2003–04	Sebastian Knüttel	TSV Großbardorf	15
2004–05	Andreas Fischer	SpVgg Bayreuth	22
2005–06	Petr Stoilov	1. FC Bad Kötzting	17
2006–07	Peter Heyer	1. FC Eintracht Bamberg	27
2007–08	Peter Heyer ^{1}	1. FC Eintracht Bamberg	18
2007–08	Sebastian Knüttel	TSV Großbardorf	18
2007–08	Mijo Stijepic	TSG Thannhausen	18
2008–09	Thomas Karg	VfL Frohnlach	24
2009–10	Christian Doll	TSV Aindling	21
2010–11	Benjamin Neunteufel	SV Schalding-Heining	25
2011–12	Cem Ekinci	SpVgg Bayern Hof	22

== Bayernliga North ==
Year	Player	Club	Goals
2012–13	Tom Jäckel	SpVgg Jahn Forchheim	25
2013–14	Christoph Hegenbart Alexander Mantlik	SpVgg SV Weiden TSV Großbardorf	18
2014–15	Florian Pieper	Viktoria Aschaffenburg	25
2015–16	Christian Breunig	Alemannia Haibach	29
2016–17	Fabian Eberle	VfB Eichstätt	28
2017–18	Björn Schnitzer	Viktoria Aschaffenburg	33
2018–19	Martin Thomann	TSV Aubstadt	24
2019–21	Simon Snaschel	TSV Großbardorf	20
2021–22	Patrick Kroiß	SpVgg Ansbach	29
2022–23	Lukas Däbritz	SV Donaustauf	25
2023–24	Lucas Schraufstetter	VfB Eichstätt	21
2024–25	Fabian Ziegler	Fortuna Regensburg	23
2025–26	Kelvin Onuigwe	Jahn Regensburg II	19

== Bayernliga South ==
Year	Player	Club	Goals
2012–13	Sebastian Kinzel	BC Aichach	25
2013–14	Florian Schrepel	TSV Bogen	22
2014–15	Sebastian Kinzel	TSV Rain am Lech	51
2015–16	Orhan Akkurt	SV Heimstetten	26
2016–17	Orhan Akkurt	SV Heimstetten	31
2017–18	Sebastiano Nappo	SV Heimstetten	28
2018–19	Lukas Dotzler	SV Pullach	20

Source:50 Jahre Bayerischer Fussball–Verband. Vindelica Verlag. 1996. p. 211.

- ^{1} Peter Heyer scored 19 goals in the 2007–08 season but since Bambergs 1–0 win against Memmingen, where he scored, was later changed to a 0–x loss due to Bamberg using two non–eligible players, only 18 of his goals were officially recognised.
