= 2012–13 Bavarian Cup =

Tournament details
- Country: Germany
- Teams: 64

Final positions
- Champions: TSV 1860 Rosenheim
- Runners-up: SV Wacker Burghausen
- DFB-Pokal: 2013–14 DFB-Pokal

Tournament statistics
- Matches played: 63
- Top goal scorer: Orhan Akkurt (SV Pullach) (7 goals)

The 2012–13 Bavarian Cup (German: Bayerischer Toto-Pokal 2012–13) was the sixteenth edition of this competition, first held in 1998 and organised by the Bavarian Football Association (BFV). The winner, TSV 1860 Rosenheim of the Regionalliga Bayern, was qualified for the first round of the 2014–15 DFB-Pokal, the German Cup where it lost to 2. Bundesliga club VfR Aalen in the first round.

The competition was open to all senior men's football teams playing within the Bavarian football league system and the 3. Liga.

== History ==
The Bavarian Cup, officially referred to as the Bayerischer Toto-Pokal for sponsorship reasons, was established in 1998. Until 2009 it was contested by only eight clubs, and qualified through the seven annual regional cup competitions. Since 2009 the Bavarian Cup has been expanded to include 64 teams in the first round.

The defending champions of the competition were SpVgg Unterhaching who defeated SC Eltersdorf in the 2011–12 final.

== Rules and regulations ==
The competition is open to all member clubs of the Bavarian Football Association except the clubs playing in the Bundesliga and 2. Bundesliga. Reserve teams are also barred from the competition. The Bavarian clubs from the 3. Liga and Regionalliga Bayern and the 24 District Cup (Kreispokale) winners qualified directly for the first round of the competition. The 98 clubs from the two divisions of the Bayernliga and the five divisions of the Landesliga Bayern entered the qualifying stage of the competition. It was the first occasion that so many clubs took part in the qualifying as, previous to 2012, the Bayernliga consisted of only one division and the Landesliga of only three. Clubs below the Landesliga had to take part in the Kreispokale to qualify.

For the 2012–13 edition this meant the two Bavarian 3. Liga clubs, the fourteen Regionalliga Bayern clubs that were not reserve sides, the 24 Kreispokal winners and 24 clubs qualified through the two rounds of qualifying entered the first round of the Bavarian Cup.

For the first two rounds of the Cup the draw was subdivided into five regional areas, for the round of sixteen in four regional areas. This arrangement reduced travel for the involved clubs and increased the likelihood of local derbies being drawn, like the Rosenheim derby in the first round or the Würzburg derby in the round of sixteen. From the quarter-finals onwards no regional subdivision was applied anymore. Clubs from lower divisions were always awarded home advantage in the draw. Should both clubs in a match be of the same division the team drawn first received home advantage. If a game was drawn after regular time no extra time was played. Instead a penalty shoot out followed to determine the winner.

The winner of the 2012–13 Bavarian Cup was automatically qualified for the first round of the German Cup the following season. The second spot awarded to the Bavarian Football Association for the first round of the German Cup went to FV Illertissen, the best-placed non-reserve side in the Regionalliga Bayern. Should the same team have won the cup and finished as the best non-reserve side in the Regionalliga the second spot would have gone to the losing finalist.

== Schedule ==
The dates set for the various rounds were:

- Qualifying rounds: 7 – 16 July 2012
- First round: 28 August – 5 September 2012
- Second round: 11 – 19 September 2012
- Round of sixteen: 3 – 17 October 2012
- Quarter finals: 28 March – 3 April 2013
- Semi finals: 30 April & 1 May 2013
- Final: 9 May 2013

== Overview ==
The final of the competition, in front of 1,800 spectators, saw a Regionalliga Bayern side playing a 3. Liga club with eventual winners TSV 1860 Rosenheim hosting SV Wacker Burghausen. The game ended 2–2 after regular time, with Rosenheim twice coming from behind. In the following penalty shoot out Rosenheim defeated Burghausen 4–3. It was the second cup win for Rosenheim who had previously won the 1999 edition, while, for SV Wacker Burghausen it was the fourth lost final in five seasons.

== Prize money ==
The BFV awarded prize money to all clubs participating in the 2012–13 edition with the winners Rosenheim receiving €5,000. The winner of the Bavarian Cup also received another €100,000 from the DFB for participating in the first round of the DFB-Pokal. Apart from this the club also received the gate receipts as all amateur clubs are guaranteed a home game for the first round.

== 2013–14 season ==
The games of the 2012–13 season:

=== First round ===
The first round, played between 28 August and 5 September 2012:

Home team	Away team	Score
TSV Güntersleben (7)(K)	Würzburger FV (4)	4–5 (pen)
TSV Röllfeld (8)(K)	Viktoria Aschaffenburg (4)	0–1
1. FC Geesdorf (8)(K)	1. FC Sand (5)	11–10 (pen)
TSV Bad Königshofen (7)(K)	TSV Großbardorf (5)	0–5
TSV Karlburg (6)	Würzburger Kickers (4)	2–3
FC Augsfeld (6)	SV Memmelsdorf (5)	3–1
TSV Kornburg (7)(K)	SpVgg Bayern Hof (4)	0–1
TuS Feuchtwangen (7)(K)	SV Seligenporten (4)	0–1
TSV Mönchröden (7)(K)	SpVgg Bayreuth (5)	0–1
VfB Rehau (8)(K)	SpVgg Oberkotzau (6)	0–1
TSV Mistelbach (7)(K)	FSV Erlangen-Bruck (4)	0–3
SpVgg Zeckern (9)(K)	SC Eltersdorf (4)	0–6
ASV Zirndorf (6)	VfL Frohnlach (4)	4–6 (pen)
ASV Neumarkt (5)	SpVgg Jahn Forchheim (5)	3–1
DJK Neßlbach (7)(K)	SV Schalding-Heining (5)	1–3
ATSV Pirkensee-Ponholz (7)(K)	TSV Bad Abbach (6)	4–1
ETSV Hainsbach (7)(K)	TV Schierling (6)	2–1
SpVgg Teisnach (9)(K)	ASV Cham (6)	0–2
ASV Burglengenfeld (7)(K)	TSV Waldkirchen (6)	8–7 (pen)
DJK SV Utzenhofen (8)(K)	DJK Ammerthal (5)	1–3
TSV Neusäß (7)(K)	FC Pipinsried (6)	0–4
SC Ichenhausen (7)(K)	FV Illertissen (4)	2–5
TSV Kirchheim (9)(K)	FC Memmingen (4)	1–9
TSV Peiting (7)(K)	BC Aichach (5)	2–4
1. FC Sonthofen (5)	TSV Rain am Lech (4)	0–4
SV Pullach (6)	TSV Schwabmünchen (5)	4–2
TSV Kastl (8)(K)	SpVgg Unterhaching (3)	1–2
MTV Pfaffenhofen (10)(K)	SV Wacker Burghausen (3)	0–10
FC Fürstenzell (7)(K)	TSV Ampfing (6)	0–2
SV Türkgücü-Ataspor München (7)(K)	FC Ismaning (4)	1–3
SB/DJK Rosenheim (5)	TSV 1860 Rosenheim (4)	0–1
SE Freising (6)	SV Heimstetten (4)	2–0

=== Second round ===
The second round, played between 11 and 19 September 2012:

Home team	Away team	Score
TSV Großbardorf (5)	Würzburger Kickers (4)	1–3
1. FC Geesdorf (8)(K)	Würzburger FV (5)	1–5
FC Augsfeld (6)	Viktoria Aschaffenburg (4)	2–6
SpVgg Oberkotzau (6)	SC Eltersdorf (4)	—^{‡}
SpVgg Bayreuth (5)	VfL Frohnlach (4)	3–2 (pen)
FSV Erlangen-Bruck (5)	SpVgg Bayern Hof (4)	0–5
ASV Neumarkt (5)	SV Seligenporten (4)	0–3
ATSV Pirkensee-Ponholz (7)(K)	ASV Cham (6)	6–7 (pen)
ASV Burglengenfeld (7)(K)	DJK Ammerthal (5)	1–4
ETSV Hainsbach (7)(K)	SV Schalding-Heining (5)	0–7
BC Aichach (5)	FC Memmingen (4)	2–4 (pen)
FC Pipinsried (6)	TSV Rain am Lech (4)	1–0
SV Pullach (6)	FV Illertissen (4)	1–3
SE Freising (6)	SpVgg Unterhaching (3)	0–5
FC Ismaning (4)	SV Wacker Burghausen (3)	0–3
TSV Ampfing (6)	TSV 1860 Rosenheim (4)	1–3

- ^{‡} Game was canceled because of bad weather and not rescheduled after SpVgg Oberkotzau withdrew from competition.

=== Round of sixteen ===
The round of sixteen, played between 3 and 17 October 2012:

Home team	Away team	Score
DJK Ammerthal (5)	SpVgg Bayern Hof (4)	0–3
SpVgg Bayreuth (5)	SV Seligenporten (4)	3–4
SC Eltersdorf (4)	Viktoria Aschaffenburg (4)	0–3
Würzburger FV (5)	Würzburger Kickers (4)	5–4 (pen)
FC Pipinsried (6)	SpVgg Unterhaching (3)	1–2
FC Memmingen (4)	FV Illertissen (4)	3–2
ASV Cham (6)	SV Wacker Burghausen (3)	1–4
SV Schalding-Heining (5)	TSV 1860 Rosenheim (4)	7–8 (pen)

=== Quarter finals ===
The quarter finals, played between 28 March and 3 April 2013:

Home team	Away team	Score
TSV 1860 Rosenheim (4)	Viktoria Aschaffenburg (4)	2–0
FC Memmingen (4)	SV Seligenporten (4)	5–3 (pen)
SpVgg Bayern Hof (4)	SpVgg Unterhaching (3)	4–3 (pen)
Würzburger FV (5)	SV Wacker Burghausen (3)	0–2

=== Semi finals ===
The semi finals, played on 30 April and 1 May 2013:

Home team	Away team	Score
SpVgg Bayern Hof (4)	SV Wacker Burghausen (3)	0–3
FC Memmingen (4)	TSV 1860 Rosenheim (4)	2–4

=== Final ===
The final, played on 9 May 2013:

Home team	Away team	Score
TSV 1860 Rosenheim (4)	SV Wacker Burghausen (3)	6–5 (pen)

=== Key ===
Symbol	League
(3)	3. Liga
(4)	Regionalliga Bayern
(5)	Bayernliga
(6)	Landesliga
(7)	Bezirksliga
(8)	Kreisliga
(9)	Kreisklasse
(10)	A-Klasse
(K)	District Cup winner

== 2013–14 DFB-Pokal ==
The 2012–13 winner TSV 1860 Rosenheim qualified through the Bavarian Cup for the 2013–14 DFB-Pokal and drew the following first round opposition:

3 August 2013
18:00

1860 Rosenheim	0–2	VfR Aalen
	Report	Junglas 51'; Klauß 85'

TSV-Stadion – Sportanlage an der Jahnstraße, Rosenheim
Attendance: 2,000
Referee: Thorben Siewer (Drolshagen)
