= 1981–82 Bayernliga =

Bayernliga
- Season: 1981–82
- Champions: FC Augsburg
- Promoted: FC Augsburg
- Relegated: SC Fürstenfeldbruck TSV 1860 Rosenheim FC Amberg ATS Kulmbach ASV Neumarkt ESV Ingolstadt
- Amateur championship: FC Schweinfurt 05
- Matches played: 380
- Goals scored: 1,214 (3.19 per match)
- Top goalscorer: Franz Schick (29 goals)

The 1981–82 season of the Bayernliga, the third tier of the German football league system in the state of Bavaria at the time, was the 37th season of the league.

== Overview ==
The league champions, FC Augsburg, were promoted to the 2. Bundesliga after successfully competing in the promotion round. For Augsburg it was their third Bayernliga title after 1972–73 and 1979–80.

Runners-up FC Schweinfurt 05 qualified for the German amateur championship, where the club lost to Hertha Zehlendorf in the first round.

The bottom five clubs were directly relegated from the league while 15th placed SC Fürstenfeldbruck had to enter the relegation round with the Landesliga runners-up where it lost to SpVgg Landshut in the first round. Fürstenfeldbruck returned to the Bayernliga in 1985 while, of the other relegated clubs, ATS Kulmbach never played in the Bayernliga again. FC Amberg won promotion back to the Bayernliga in 1986, ESV Ingolstadt in 1984, TSV 1860 Rosenheim in 1995 and ASV Neumarkt in 2000.

Franz Schick of TSV Ampfing was the league's top scorer with 29, his second of five top scorer awards in the league, achieved between 1980 and 1988.

== Table ==
The 1981–82 season saw six new clubs in the league, SpVgg Unterhaching, 1. FC Bamberg, FC Vilshofen and TSV Schwaben Augsburg, all promoted from the Landesliga Bayern, while FC Augsburg and ESV Ingolstadt had been relegated from the 2. Bundesliga Süd to the league.

For SpVgg Unterhaching it was the first-ever season in the league while Bamberg had last played in the league in 1976 and Vilshofen in 1980. Schwaben Augsburg, the first team to win Bayernliga promotion as a Landesliga runners-up after promotion/relegation play-off had been introduced in the previous season, had last played in the Bayernliga in 1960. Of the two clubs relegated to the league FC Augsburg had won it in 1979–80 and Ingolstadt the season before, both thereby earning promotion to the 2. Bundesliga.

Pos	Team	Pld	W	D	L	GF	GA	GD	Pts	Promotion, qualification or relegation
1	FC Augsburg (C, P)	38	26	8	4	80	32	+48	60	Qualification to 2. Bundesliga promotion round
2	FC Schweinfurt 05 (Q)	38	23	7	8	74	29	+45	53	Qualification to German amateur championship
3	Kickers Würzburg	38	22	7	9	90	64	+26	51	
4	MTV Ingolstadt	38	19	9	10	91	52	+39	47	
5	SpVgg Unterhaching	38	19	7	12	68	44	+24	45	
6	VfB Helmbrechts	38	18	9	11	72	56	+16	45	
7	1. FC Bamberg	38	18	8	12	75	54	+21	44	
8	TSV Ampfing	38	17	8	13	63	58	+5	42	
9	FC Vilshofen	38	15	11	12	62	68	−6	41	
10	FC Memmingen	38	15	10	13	65	59	+6	40	
11	VfL Frohnlach	38	17	6	15	53	54	−1	40	
12	TSV Schwaben Augsburg	38	11	15	12	47	52	−5	37	
13	1. FC Nürnberg Amateure	38	14	8	16	55	61	−6	36	
14	Bayern Munich Amateure	38	13	10	15	58	65	−7	36	
15	SC Fürstenfeldbruck (R)	38	11	9	18	53	68	−15	31	Qualification to relegation play-off
16	TSV 1860 Rosenheim (R)	38	7	14	17	37	61	−24	28	Relegation to Landesliga Bayern
17	FC Amberg (R)	38	7	11	20	46	70	−24	25	Relegation to Landesliga Bayern
18	ATS Kulmbach (R)	38	5	12	21	44	87	−43	22	Relegation to Landesliga Bayern
19	ASV Neumarkt (R)	38	6	7	25	36	80	−44	19	Relegation to Landesliga Bayern
20	ESV Ingolstadt (R)	38	5	8	25	45	100	−55	18	Relegation to Landesliga Bayern

Source: manfredsfussballarchiv.de, f-archiv.de
Rules for classification: 1) Points; 2) Decider;
(C) Champions; (P) Promoted; (Q) Qualified for the phase indicated; (R) Relegated

== 2. Bundesliga promotion round ==
In the southern group the champions of the Oberliga Baden-Württemberg, Oberliga Hessen, Oberliga Südwest and the Bayernliga competed for two promotion spots to the 2. Bundesliga:

Pos	Team	Pld	W	D	L	GF	GA	GD	Pts	Promotion, qualification or relegation
1	FSV Frankfurt (P)	3	2	0	1	4	4	0	4	Promotion to 2. Bundesliga
2	FC Augsburg (P)	3	1	1	1	4	3	+1	3	Promotion to 2. Bundesliga
3	SSV Ulm 1846	3	1	1	1	3	3	0	3	
4	FC Homburg	3	0	2	1	3	4	−1	2	

Source: Weltfussball.de
Rules for classification: 1) Points; 2) Goal difference;
(P) Promoted

== Bayernliga promotion round ==
The 15th placed Bayernliga team had to face the runners-up of the three Landesligas for one more place in the Bayernliga.

Date	Match			Result
Semi-finals : in Freising and Feuchtwangen
Thursday 17 June 1982	SC Fürstenfeldbruck	–	SpVgg Landshut (Mitte)	0–1
Thursday 17 June 1982	SpVgg Kaufbeuren (Süd)	–	FT Schweinfurt (Nord)	1–2
Final : in Nuremberg
Sunday, 20 June 1982	SpVgg Landshut	–	FT Schweinfurt	2–0
