= Philipp Knochner =

German footballer

Personal information
- Date of birth: 22 May 1993 (age 33)
- Place of birth: Munich, Germany
- Height: 1.80 m (5 ft 11 in)
- Position: Midfielder

Team information
- Current team: Schalding-Heining
- Number: 28

Youth career
- TuS Großkarolinenfeld
- TSV 1860 Rosenheim
- –2012: Wacker Burghausen

Senior career*
Years	Team	Apps	(Gls)
2012–2014	Wacker Burghausen II	49	(0)
2012–2018	Wacker Burghausen	82	(1)
2018–	Schalding-Heining	130	(2)
- * Club domestic league appearances and goals as of 1 May 2024

Philipp Kochner (born 22 May 1993) is a German footballer who plays for SV Schalding-Heining.
