= Karsten Wettberg =

German football manager (1941–2026)

Personal information
- Date of birth: 10 November 1941
- Place of birth: Friesack, Gau March of Brandenburg, Germany
- Date of death: 29 March 2026 (aged 84)

Senior career*
Years	Team	Apps	(Gls)
- FC Mainburg
- TSV Au/Hallertau
- TSV Elsendorf
- SV Puttenhausen
- TSV Sandelzhausen
- TSV Obersüßbach
- SpVgg Feldmoching
- SV Saal

Managerial career
- 1980–1983: MTV Ingolstadt
- 1983–1986: ESV Ingolstadt
- 1986–1987: SpVgg Landshut
- 1987–1989: SpVgg Unterhaching
- 1990–1992: 1860 Munich
- 1992: Jahn Regensburg
- 1992–1993: SpVgg Landshut
- 1993–1994: MTV Ingolstadt
- 1994–1995: SG Post/Süd Regensburg
- 1995–1996: FC Augsburg
- 1996–1998: SG Post/Süd Regensburg
- 1998–2001: Jahn Regensburg
- 2001–2003: SpVgg Landshut
- 2003–2004: ASV Cham
- 2004–2006: Freier TuS Regensburg
- 2009–2013: SV Seligenporten
- 2013–2015: ATSV Kelheim
- * Club domestic league appearances and goals

Karsten Wettberg (10 November 1941 – 29 March 2026) was a German football manager. He was one of the most successful football managers in German amateur football.

On professional level, he coached SpVgg Unterhaching and 1860 Munich in the 2. Bundesliga.

== Biography ==
Wettberg was born in Friesack, near Berlin on 10 November 1941.

He joined the German postal service, whom he worked for until his retirement in July 2002. He entered local politics in April that year, being elected to his local district council in Kelheim. He was an unsuccessful candidate in the 2008 Bavarian Landtag elections for the Social Democratic Party of Germany.

Wettberg spent his playing career exclusively with Bavarian amateur clubs, eventually becoming player coach of SV Saal. He entered the top league of Bavarian football for the first time in 1980, when he took over as manager of MTV Ingolstadt, the club just having been relegated from the 2. Bundesliga Süd. With MTV, he won the Bayernliga in its first season there but in that season, 1980–81, no promotion from the third to the second tier was available as the 2. Bundesliga was reduced from two to one division. He stayed with the club until 1983.

He coached local rival ESV Ingolstadt after this, a club that had just dropped from the second to the fourth division in two seasons. He won the tier-four Landesliga Bayern-Süd with ESV in 1984 and earned promotion to the Bayernliga. ESV, a club in decline, finished eighth in the league in 1985, but came only 16th in 1986, disappearing from the Bayernliga for good.

Wettberg coached SpVgg Landshut in 1986–87, the club having won the Bayernliga title in 1985–86 but not having been prepared to take the risk of turning professional and declined the right to take part in the 2nd Bundesliga promotion round.

He coached SpVgg Unterhaching after this, whom he won two more Bayernliga titles with, in 1988 and 1989. In his second attempt with the club, he also earned promotion to the 2. Bundesliga. He continued as coach of the club in the second division but departed in January 1990, the club suffering relegation at the end of the season.

Wettberg became manager of 1860 Munich in February 1990, when the club was playing in the tier-three Bayernliga. At this point, 1860 had attempted to return to professional football since their forced relegation in 1982. He finished second with the club in 1990 and won the Bayernliga the year after. Under his guidance, from February 1990 to the end of the Bayernliga season in June 1991, the club did not lose a game, remaining unbeaten for 54 games. For his achievement with the Munich club, the then-major of Munich, Georg Kronawitter, crowned Wettberg the König von Giesing, the King of Giesing. In the 2. Bundesliga, Wettberg was not as successful with the club, being sacked after a loss to VfB Leipzig. 1860 had been battling against relegation all season long and was relegated after Wettberg's departure.

After a brief stint at Jahn Regensburg in 1992, he returned to SpVgg Landshut from 1992 to 1993, the club winning promotion back to the Bayernliga then. He managed MTV Ingolstadt once more in 1993–94, taking this club back to the Bayernliga, too. His next club was SG Post/Süd Regensburg in the Landesliga Bayern-Mitte.

He coached FC Augsburg in the Regionalliga Süd from July 1995 to September 1996 before returning to SG Post/Süd. With this club, he achieved an excellent third place in the Bayernliga 1997–98 and moved then on, across town, to Jahn Regensburg. The Jahn, a club in decline since the mid-1970s, experienced a revival under Wettberg, first winning the Landesliga Bayern-Mitte in 1999 and then taking out the Bayernliga title the year after and earning promotion to the Regionalliga. He left the Jahn at the end of the 2000–01 season, after a 12th place in the Regionalliga and returned to Landshut for a third time. With this club, he won the Landesliga once more.

In 2003, he joined ASV Cham for a season, a club that had once been a second division outfit but now had become a long-term Landesliga club. From there, he went to TuS Regensburg, also in the Landesliga, and managed to take them to second place in the league, his last coaching engagement for the time.

For his engagement in football, he was awarded the Bundesverdienstkreuz in 2006.

From 28 March 2007 to 27 May 2008, Wettberg was Vice president of TSV 1860 Munich, a club he was still connected to.

In April 2009, Wettberg returned to managing, taking over SV Seligenporten, a team which had not won a game in seven months and sat on a relegation rank. He successfully navigated the team through four relegation deciders, maintaining Seligenportens league place. The final game was a 1–0 win over SpVgg Landshut, a team he had coached three times before. With this win, Wettberg continued his run of never having been relegated with a club he coached. Wettberg successfully took Seligenporten into the Regionalliga Bayern, stepping down from his role at the end of the 2012–13 season to take up coaching at amateur club ATSV 1871 Kelheim.

Wettberg died on 29 March 2026, at the age of 84.

== Honours ==
- 2. Bundesliga promotion: 1989, 1991
- Bayernliga: 1981, 1986, 1988, 1989, 1991, 2000
- Landesliga Bayern-Süd: 1984
- Landesliga Bayern-Mitte: 1999, 2003
