= Bastian Kurz =

German footballer

Personal information
- Full name: Bastian Kurz
- Date of birth: 23 September 1996 (age 30)
- Place of birth: Altötting, Germany
- Height: 1.78 m (5 ft 10 in)
- Position: Midfielder

Team information
- Current team: Schwaben Augsburg
- Number: 9

Youth career
- SV Unterneukirchen
- Wacker Burghausen
- –2015: FC Augsburg

Senior career*
Years	Team	Apps	(Gls)
2015–2017	FC Augsburg II	48	(7)
2017–2018	Rot-Weiß Erfurt	23	(0)
2018–2019	FC Augsburg II	28	(5)
2019–2020	Kickers Offenbach	5	(0)
2020–	Schwaben Augsburg	142	(32)
- * Club domestic league appearances and goals as of 28 June 2026

Bastian Kurz (born 23 September 1996) is a German footballer who plays as a midfielder for TSV Schwaben Augsburg in the Regionalliga Bayern.
