= Moritz Sommerauer =

Austrian footballer (born 1992)

Personal information
- Date of birth: 27 August 1992 (age 34)
- Place of birth: Eggelsberg, Austria
- Height: 1.79 m (5 ft 10 in)
- Position: Right-back

Team information
- Current team: Wacker Burghausen
- Number: 35

Youth career
- –2006: USV Eggelsberg
- 2006–2011: SV Ried

Senior career*
Years	Team	Apps	(Gls)
2010–2011	SV Ried II	22	(2)
2011–2014	Wacker Burghausen	38	(0)
2012–2014	→ Wacker Burghausen II	9	(0)
2015–2017	Wacker Burghausen	64	(2)
2017–2019	TSV Buchbach	49	(0)
2019–2021	1860 Rosenheim	25	(2)
2021–	Wacker Burghausen	88	(5)
- * Club domestic league appearances and goals as of 1 January 2025

Moritz Sommerauer (né Moritz Moser; born 27 August 1992) is an Austrian professional footballer who plays as a right-back for the German Regionalliga Bayern club Wacker Burghausen.

== Personal life ==
Moritz changed his last name from Moser to Sommerauer after his marriage.
