= 1998 Bavarian Cup =

German regional football competition

- Founded
- 1998
- Nation
- Germany
- State
- Bavaria
- Qualifying competition for
- German Cup
- Champions 1998
- SV Schalding-Heining

The 1998 Bavarian Cup was the first edition of this competition. It ended with the SV Schalding-Heining winning the competition. Together with the finalist, SG Post/Süd Regensburg, both clubs were qualified for the DFB Cup 1998-99.

The competition is open to all senior men's football teams playing within the Bavarian football league system and the Bavarian clubs in the Regionalliga Süd (III).

== Rules & History ==
The seven Bezirke in Bavaria each play their own cup competition which in turn used to function as a qualifying to the German Cup (DFB-Pokal). Since 1998 these seven cup-winners plus the losing finalist of the region that won the previous event advance to the newly introduced Bavarian Cup, the Toto-Pokal. The two finalists of this competition advance to the German Cup. Bavarian clubs which play in the first or second Bundesliga are not permitted to take part in the event, their reserve teams however can. The seven regional cup winners were qualified for the first round.

== Participating clubs ==
The following seven clubs qualified for the 1999 Bavarian Cup:

Club	League	Tier	Cup performance
SV Schalding-Heining	Bezirksoberliga Niederbayern	VI	Winner
SG Post/Süd Regensburg	Oberliga Bayern	IV	Final
			Semi-final
			Semi-final
SpVgg Jahn Forchheim	Oberliga Bayern	IV	First round
			First round
			First round

== Bavarian Cup season 1998-99 ==
Teams qualified for the next round in bold.

=== Regional finals ===
Region	Date	Winner	Finalist	Result
Oberbayern Cup		**TSV 1860 Munich II**		
Niederbayern Cup		**SV Schalding-Heining**		
Schwaben Cup		**BC Aichach**	FC Memmingen	1-1 ^{1}
Oberpfalz Cup		**SG Post/Süd Regensburg**		
Mittelfranken Cup		**SpVgg Jahn Forchheim**	1. FC Nuremberg II	
Oberfranken Cup				
Unterfranken Cup				

- ^{1} Until the end of the 1997–98 season, a rule of the Schwaben FA stipulated that, in case of a draw after extra time, the lower classed team advances. A penalty shoot-out only applied if both teams played on the same league level. The rule was changed after 1998.

=== First round ===
Date	Home	Away	Result
1999	Jahn Forchheim	**TSV 1860 Munich II**	
1999			
1999			
			bye

=== Semi-finals ===
Date	Home	Away	Result
1999			
1999			

=== Final ===
Date	Home	Away	Result	Attendance
1999	**SV Schalding-Heining**	SG Post/Süd Regensburg	1-1 / 6-4 after pen.	

== DFB Cup 1998-99 ==
The two clubs, SV Schalding-Heining and SG Post/Süd Regensburg, who qualified through the Bavarian Cup for the DFB Cup 1998-99 both were knocked out in the first round of the national cup competition:

Round	Date	Home	Away	Result	Attendance
First round	28 August 1998	SV Schalding-Heining	SpVgg Unterhaching	0-1	2,200
First round	30 August 1998	SG Post/Süd Regensburg	Hertha BSC Berlin	0-2	5,000
