= Benedikt Krug =

German footballer

Personal information
- Full name: Benedikt Krug
- Date of birth: 7 February 1995 (age 31)
- Place of birth: Germany
- Height: 1.93 m (6 ft 4 in)
- Position: Centre-back

Team information
- Current team: Schwaben Augsburg
- Number: 22

Youth career
- –2012: FC Augsburg
- 2012–2013: FC Stätzling

Senior career*
Years	Team	Apps	(Gls)
2013–2014	BC Aichach	25	(1)
2013–2014	BC Aichach II	8	(0)
2014	TSV Schwabmünchen	19	(0)
2015	Erzgebirge Aue	0	(0)
2015	Erzgebirge Aue II	6	(0)
2015–2016	TSV Rain am Lech	21	(1)
2016–2020	FV Illertissen	99	(7)
2020–	Schwaben Augsburg	147	(21)
- * Club domestic league appearances and goals as of 27 September 2026

Benedikt Krug (born 7 February 1995) is a German footballer who plays as a centre-back for Schwaben Augsburg.

== Career ==
Krug joined 2. Bundesliga side Erzgebirge Aue at the start of 2015, though the team was relegated to the 3. Liga at the end of the season. He made his professional debut for the club in the 2015–16 DFB-Pokal on 8 August 2015, coming on as a substitute in the 89th minute for Simon Skarlatidis in the home match against 2. Bundesliga side Greuther Fürth, with the match finishing as a 1–0 win. In 2016, he was on trial with Chicago Fire of Major League Soccer, though he did not sign with the club.
