= 2010–11 Bayernliga =

Bayernliga
- Season: 2010–11
- Champions: FC Ismaning
- Promoted: FC Ingolstadt 04 II
- Relegated: SpVgg Bayreuth, SV Schalding-Heining, Freier TuS Regensburg
- Matches: 306
- Goals: 971 (3.17 per match)
- Average goals/game: 3.18
- Top goalscorer: Benjamin Neunteufel (25 goals)
- Biggest home win: Rosenheim 7–0 Erlangen
- Biggest away win: Bamberg 0–6 Rosenheim
- Highest scoring: Ismaning 5–5 Bayreuth
- Longest winning run: 8 games FC Ingolstadt 04 II TSV 1860 Rosenheim
- Longest unbeaten run: 14 games FC Ismaning
- Longest winless run: 13 games Freier TuS Regensburg
- Longest losing run: 9 games Freier TuS Regensburg
- Highest attendance: 3,078: 1. FC Schweinfurt 05 v Würzburger FV
- Lowest attendance: 80 Freier TuS Regensburg v TSV Rain am Lech
- Total attendance: 140,904
- Average attendance: 460

The 2010–11 season of the Bayernliga, the highest association football league in Bavaria, was the third season of the league at tier five (V) of the German football league system and the 66th season overall since establishment of the league in 1945. The season started on 25 July 2010 and finished after 34 rounds on 28 May 2011, followed by three more relegation play-off games in early June.

== Overview ==
As the league champions, FC Ismaning, declined promotion for financial reasons, the runners-up FC Ingolstadt 04 II were directly promoted to the 2011–12 Regionalliga Süd. As Ismaning already announced during the winter break that it intended not apply for a Regionalliga licence, fears were voiced the competition could be affected negatively by this but the team continued its good form and took out the championship regardless. The three worst placed teams, SpVgg Bayreuth, SV Schalding-Heining and Freier TuS Regensburg were relegated to their respective Landesligas. The 15th placed team, SpVgg Bayern Hof, won its relegation match and was able to secure its league spot for another season. Bayern Hof, who was already relegated was able to overturn a 2-point deduction and consequently finished on equal points with SpVgg Bayreuth on place 15 and 16. In the necessary decider, Hof overcame Bayreuth 2–1 in extra time and earned the right to enter the relegation play-off while Bayreuth was directly relegated.

While no team was relegated to the league for the 2011–12 season, three teams were directly promoted to the league, SB/DJK Rosenheim, SC Eltersdorf and VfL Frohnlach. Additionally, the TSV Gersthofen was promoted through the play-off round. While Rosenheim makes its first return to the league since 1979, Frohnlach won immediate promotion back to the league after suffering relegation in 2010. Eltersdorf will play in the Bayernliga for the first time in the club's history while Gersthofen has not played in the league since the 1960s.

The best supported team during the season was the 1. FC Schweinfurt 05 with 913 spectators per match while the SpVgg Unterhaching II had the worst support with an average of 188. Schweinfurt also set the attendance record for the season, drawing 3,078 spectators in the club's home game against Würzburger FV. TSV 1860 Rosenheim set both the record for the biggest away- and home win, set on consecutive weekends. On 14 May, the club defeated FSV Erlangen-Bruck 7–0 in Rosenheim, followed by a 6–0 win at FC Eintracht Bamberg on 21 May, with Rosenheim winning all of its last eight games of the season.

Benjamin Neunteufel of relegated side SV Schalding-Heining took out the top-scorer honors, scoring 25 goals, four more than runners-up Peter Heyer. Heyer, who had been the league's top scorer in 2006–07 and 2007–08, then with FC Eintracht Bamberg. He initially played for FSV Erlangen-Bruck (16 goals) before making a return to Bamberg (5 goals) during the winter break. After the relegation of Schalding-Heining, Neunteufel opted to join Austrian Regionalliga club FC Wels instead of another Bayernliga club, not wanting to move away from Passau.

During the season, it was decided that the 2011–12 season would be the last for the league in its current format. From 2012, the league will be played in two regional divisions, north and south.

Location of teams in the 2010–11 Bayernliga

The league featured five new clubs for the 2010–11 season:

- FC Eintracht Bamberg, relegated from the Regionalliga Süd
- SV Heimstetten, promoted from the Landesliga Süd
- 1. FC Schweinfurt 05 and Würzburger FV, promoted from the Landesliga Nord
- Freier TuS Regensburg, promoted from the Landesliga Mitte

== League table ==
Pos	Team	Pld	W	D	L	GF	GA	GD	Pts	Promotion, qualification or relegation
1	FC Ismaning (C)	34	18	12	4	72	48	+24	66	
2	FC Ingolstadt 04 II (P)	34	19	6	9	75	48	+27	63	Promotion to Regionalliga Süd
3	TSV 1860 Rosenheim	34	17	2	15	58	39	+19	53	
4	TSV Buchbach	34	15	8	11	58	51	+7	53	
5	Würzburger FV	34	16	4	14	57	52	+5	52	
6	SV Seligenporten	34	14	10	10	59	56	+3	52	
7	SpVgg Unterhaching II	34	15	6	13	53	44	+9	51	
8	FC Eintracht Bamberg	34	15	6	13	54	61	−7	51	
9	FC Schweinfurt 05	34	14	8	12	48	50	−2	50	
10	TSV Großbardorf	34	11	12	11	53	54	−1	45	
11	FSV Erlangen-Bruck	34	12	9	13	59	79	−20	45	
12	TSV Rain am Lech	34	12	8	14	52	47	+5	44	
13	TSV Aindling	34	12	7	15	40	39	+1	43	
14	SV Heimstetten	34	12	7	15	53	53	0	43	
15	Bayern Hof (Note: SpVgg Bayern Hof were initially docked 2 points but the points were later reinstated.)	34	10	11	13	50	56	−6	41	Qualification to relegation playoffs
16	SpVgg Bayreuth (R)	34	11	8	15	45	63	−18	41	Relegation to Landesliga Bayern-Nord
17	SV Schalding-Heining (R)	34	8	8	18	47	66	−19	32	Relegation to Landesliga Bayern-Mitte
18	Freier TuS Regensburg (R)	34	5	8	21	38	74	−36	23	Relegation to Landesliga Bayern-Mitte

Source: bfv.de
Rules for classification: 1) points; 2) goal difference; 3) number of goals scored.
(C) Champions; (P) Promoted; (R) Relegated

== Top goalscorers ==
The top goal scorers for the season:

25 goals

- (Germany) Benjamin Neunteufel (SV Schalding-Heining)

21 goals

- (Germany) Peter Heyer (FSV Erlangen-Bruck/FC Eintracht Bamberg)

19 goals

- (Germany) Florian Niederlechner (FC Ismaning)

17 goals

- (Germany) Nicolas Görtler (FC Eintracht Bamberg)

16 goals

- (Germany) Ralf Klingmann (TSV Buchbach)
- (Germany) Tobias Riedner (Würzburger FV)

== Play-offs ==
=== Decider for 15th place ===
A decider was necessary to determine the 15th and 16th place as the BFV does not recognise the goal difference as a means to determine relegation and promotion spots when two or more clubs are on equal points but instead requires a decider to be played:

1 June 2011

SpVgg Bayern Hof	2–1 aet	SpVgg Bayreuth
Bächer 65' Schäffler 117'	Report	Klaszka 5' Jakl (red card) 44' Pfann (red card) 120'

Bamberg
Attendance: 2,457
Referee: Wolfgang Stark (Ergolding)

=== Promotion round ===
The 2011 promotion round to the Bayernliga:

4 June 2011

TSV Gersthofen (S)	3–1	SpVgg Selbitz (N)
Hintersberger 25' Römer 50' Obermeyer 90+4'	Report	Schmidt 17'

Schwabach
Attendance: 1,000
Referee: Thomas Stein (Homburg am Main)

5 June 2011

SpVgg Bayern Hof (B)	1–0	SSV Jahn Regensburg II (M)
Bächer 81'	Report	Morina (red card) 62'

Weiden
Attendance: 1,850
Referee: Benjamin Cortus (Burgfarrnbach)

=== Key ===
- (B) denotes Bayernliga club
- (S) denotes Landesliga Süd club
- (M) denotes Landesliga Mitte club
- (N) denotes Landesliga Nord club
