= SG Post/Süd Regensburg =

German football club

- Full name: Sport Gemeinschaft Post/Süd Regensburg e. V.
- Founded: 1928
- Chairman: Fritz Schweinfurter
- League: football department defunct
Home colours	Away colours

The SG Post/Süd Regensburg was a German association football club from the city of Regensburg, Bavaria. The club is still active in many sports, having twenty-two separate departments, but no longer fields a football side since that department left to merge with Jahn Regensburg in 2002.

== History ==
Formed in 1928, the club made its first notable appearance on the German football scene when it qualified for the DFB-Pokal (German Cup) competition in 1981, then under the name Post SV Regensburg as a fifth division Bezirksliga side. Away at Tennis Borussia Berlin, the team left a good impression, losing to the Oberliga Berlin (III) club 4–3 in Berlin. That same season, 1981–82, the club won promotion to the tier-four Landesliga Bayern-Mitte as well.

It played only a Landesliga single season, but was back two years later, for an eleven-year stint from 1985 to 1996. As an additional attraction, the league often included local powerhouse Jahn Regensburg which had fallen on hard times. In 1988, the club merged with TSG Süd Regensburg to form the SG Post/Süd Regensburg.

After a number of seasons spent mid-table, the club began to improve in 1993 and earned promotion to the Oberliga Bayern in 1996 after winning a Landesliga title. It managed to stay at this level for three seasons, a third place in 1997–98 being the absolute highlight. In the 1997–98 season, former German international Dieter Eckstein played for the club. The team also made another appearance in the German Cup in 1998. Twice in this era, the club was coached by Karsten Wettberg, one of the most successful coaches in Bavarian amateur football, having six Bavarian championships in his name.

The season after, it was relegated from the Oberliga but managed to break the fall and remain a good Landesliga side. In 2002, the club earned promotion to the Oberliga once more, but refused the move, instead merging its football department with Jahn Regensburg and becoming that club's reserve side, playing in the Oberliga. Parent club SG Post/Süd still exists, but no longer has a football department.

== Honours ==
The club's honours:

=== League ===
- Landesliga Bayern-Mitte (V)
  - Champions: (2) 1996, 2002

=== Cup ===
- Bavarian Cup
  - Runners-up: 1998
- Oberpfalz Cup
  - Winners: 1998
  - Runners-up: 2000

=== Youth ===
- Under 17 Bayernliga
  - Runners-up: 1998

== Final seasons ==
The season-by-season performance of the club in its final years:

Season	Division	Tier	Position
1992–93	Landesliga Bayern-Mitte	IV	9th
1993–94	Landesliga Bayern-Mitte	IV	5th
1994–95	Landesliga Bayern-Mitte	V	3rd
1995–96	Landesliga Bayern-Mitte	V	1st ↑
1996–97	Bayernliga	IV	6th
1997–98	Bayernliga	IV	3rd
1998–99	Bayernliga	IV	16th ↓
1999–2000	Landesliga Bayern-Mitte	V	3rd
2000–01	Landesliga Bayern-Mitte	V	5th
2001–02	Landesliga Bayern-Mitte	V	1st ↑

- With the introduction of the Bezirksoberligas in 1988 as the new fifth tier, below the Landesligas, all leagues below dropped one tier. With the introduction of the Regionalligas in 1994 as the new third tier, below the 2. Bundesliga, all leagues below dropped one tier.

↑ Promoted	↓ Relegated

== DFB Cup appearances ==
The club reached the first round of the German Cup twice, both times against a club from Berlin:

Season	Round	Date	Home	Away	Result	Attendance
1981–82	First round	28 August 1981	Tennis Borussia Berlin	SG Post/Süd Regensburg	4–3	
1998–99	First round	30 August 1998	SG Post/Süd Regensburg	Hertha BSC Berlin	0–2	5,000
