= SpVgg Bayreuth =

German football club

- Full name: Spielvereinigung Oberfranken Bayreuth 1921 e.V.
- Nickname: Die Altstädter (the Oldtowners)
- Founded: 1921
- Ground: Hans-Walter-Wild-Stadion
- Capacity: 21,500
- Manager: Lukas Kling
- League: Regionalliga Bayern (IV)
- 2025–26: Regionalliga Bayern, 13th of 18
Home colours	Away colours

SpVgg Bayreuth is a German football club based in Bayreuth, Bavaria. Apart from coming within two games of earning promotion to the Bundesliga in 1979, the club also reached the quarter finals of the DFB-Pokal twice, in 1977 and 1980. The club was founded in 1921 and currently plays in the Regionalliga Bayern.

== History ==
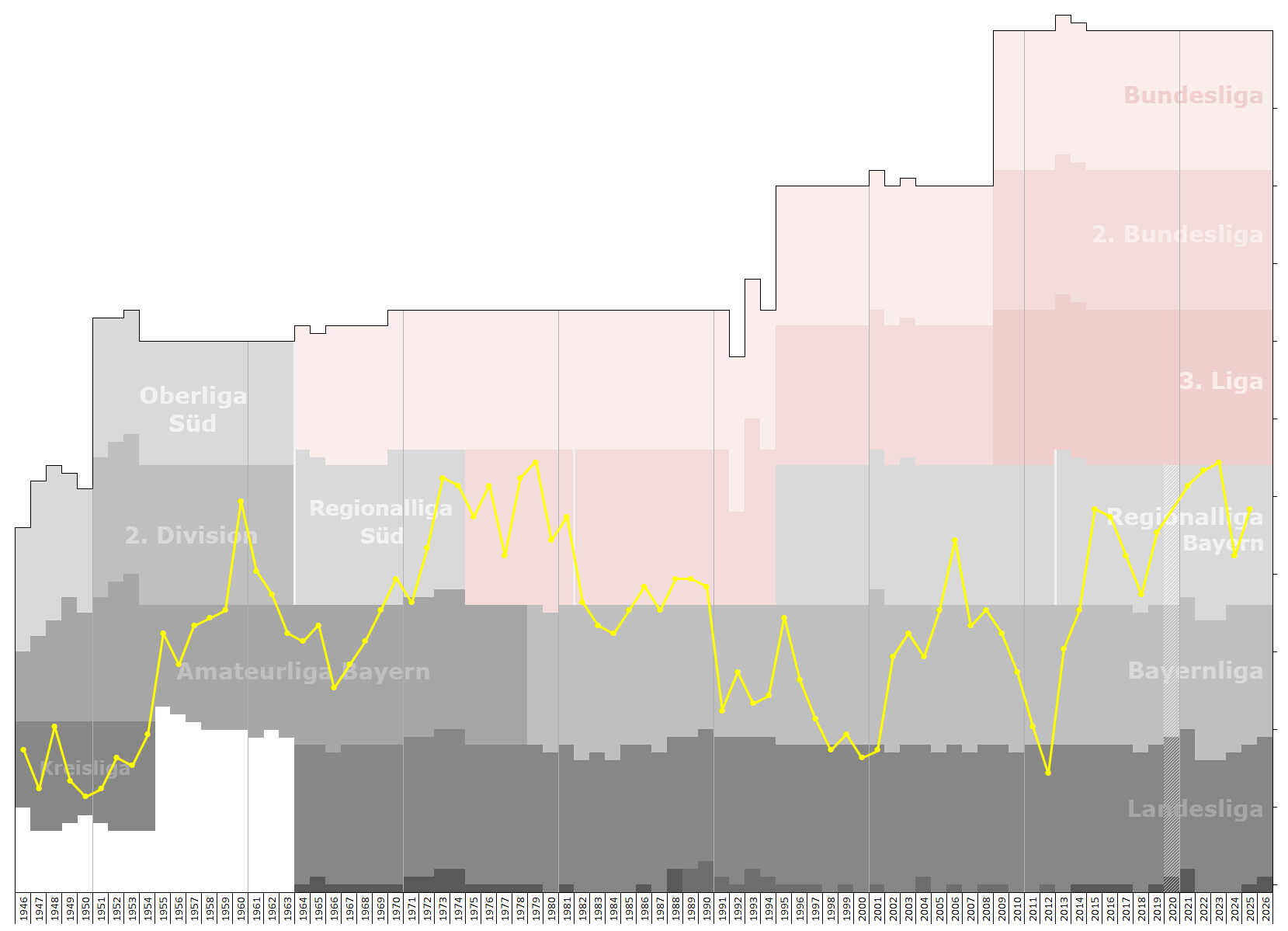
Historical chart of the club's league performance

=== 1921 to 1945 ===
Founded in 1921 when the side left gymnastics oriented sport club TuSpo Bayreuth, SpVgg Bayreuth was one of many clubs banned and replaced with a state-sanctioned organization in 1933 during the Nazi campaign against existing sports and other social organizations. A handful of club members reformed a rump side called FSV Bayreuth to carry on the activities of the original association. This team was made up largely of soldiers stationed locally, which resulted in a constantly changing lineup as they were transferred in and out of the area. The old club was quickly resurrected after World War II.

=== 1945 to 1963 ===
The club initially stood in the shadow of two local rivals, FC Bayreuth and VfB Bayreuth, with the later taking out the Amateurliga Nordbayern (III) title in 1956. SpVgg had earned promotion to this league in 1954, having won the 2. Amateurliga Oberfranken-West title that year and then dominated its promotion round.

The club achieved good results in the Bayernliga and managed to win its division in 1959. The team then went on to beat southern champions Schwaben Augsburg in the finals for the Bavarian title. As the Bavarian champions, the club was entitled to enter the promotion round to the 2. Oberliga Süd, where it had to overcome VfR Pforzheim 2–1 after extra time in a narrow decider for promotion to the second division.

The club spent three seasons in the second tier of Southern German football, achieving a remarkable fifth place in its first year. The second season was a struggle against relegation and, in the third and last one, it was sent down back to the Bayernliga again.

A fourth place in the last season before the league reform in 1963 saw the club qualify for the new single-division Amateurliga Bayern from 1963.

=== 1963 to 2013 ===
After the formation of the Bundesliga in 1963, Bayreuth played as a third division team until 1969. Another Amateurliga championship meant promotion to the second tier once more, now the Regionalliga Süd. It proved a short stay and SpVgg was narrowly relegated, losing a decider to ESV Ingolstadt 5–2 after finishing on equal points.

Back in the Bayernliga, the club won an undisputed championship, losing only two out of their 34 games, 15 points clear of the second-placed Wacker München. After another difficult first year in the second division, the club established itself in the league, coming fourth in 1973 and fifth in 1974, results that proved enough to qualify for the new 2. Bundesliga Süd.

The club did quite well in the new league and they came close to moving up to the Bundesliga in 1979 after a second-place finish in 2. Bundesliga Süd (the southern division of 2. Bundesliga), but lost in the promotion round 1–1 and 1–2 to Bayer Uerdingen. It managed to qualify for the new single-division 2. Bundesliga in 1981, too, but the first season in this league was very disappointing and the team was relegated to the Oberliga in 1982, having come last.

The team became a top-side in the Oberliga but took until 1985 to take out the league title again and returned to the second division.

Although relegated to Amateur Oberliga Bayern (III) in 1988 and 1989, the team was spared further demotion when clubs that had finished ahead of them were denied licences due to their financial problems. Bayreuth could not evade relegation after a third consecutive poor finish in 1990, and in 1994 slipped further still to the Bayernliga (IV). A strong campaign returned the side to the Regionalliga Süd (III) for 2005–06. The club was denied a license for the Regionalliga in the 2006/07 season and forcibly relegated to the 4th division Bayernliga. The club won the Bayernliga title for a seventh time, building up a convincing margin to the second placed team, and fulfilling the on-the-field qualification to the Regionalliga. On 11 June 2008, the club was refused a licence for this league and has to remain in the Bayernliga. The club's financial trouble however continued, having to declare insolvency on 22 October 2008, despite sitting second in the league.

In the 2010–11 Bayernliga season, the club unsuccessfully struggled against relegation, dropping down to the Landesliga after a 1–2 extra-time loss to Bayern Hof in a relegation decider.

At the end of the 2011–12 season the club qualified directly for the newly expanded Bayernliga after finishing fourth in the Landesliga.

=== 2013 to present ===
==== Organisational changes ====
Logo until 2022

On 8 May 2013, the members of SpVgg Bayreuth made a decision in a general meeting to separate the first men's team and establish Spielvereinigung Oberfranken Bayreuth von 1921 Spielbetriebs GmbH, which was founded on 26 June 2013. They also expanded the club's name to Spielvereinigung Oberfranken Bayreuth von 1921 e.V., including the Bavarian administrative district of Upper Franconia. Out of the 116 members present, 104 voted in favor. Following the separation, the club retained 60% ownership of the operational company, while the remaining 40% was divided between construction entrepreneur Alois Dechant and steel tube chair manufacturer Franz Stegner. After Franz Stegner's death, Erwin Stechert, alongside Alois Dechant, held 20% ownership of the operational company. These 20% were transferred to the association on 4 May 2021. On 13 July 2022, the club also acquired the 20% previously held by Alois Dechant. Currently, Spielvereinigung Oberfranken Bayreuth von 1921 e.V. holds 100% ownership of the operational company.

==== First-team performances ====
In 2014, the team achieved promotion to the Regionalliga Bayern and immediately secured a commendable 6th-place finish in the 2014–15 season. In 2021, they made their return to the DFB-Pokal, where they faced Arminia Bielefeld at home in a 6–3 loss.

After a fiercely contested 2021–22 Regionalliga season, in which SpVgg Bayreuth and Bayern Munich engaged in a prolonged battle for the top spot, Bayern Munich II suffered a defeat against Wacker Burghausen in the penultimate match of the season. This loss meant that SpVgg Bayreuth mathematically secured the first-place position and clinched the championship of the Regionalliga Bayern, thus earning promotion to the unified 3. Liga two matchdays before the end of the season. Consequently, Bayreuth returned to professional football after a hiatus of 32 years, commencing from the 2022–23 season.

For the new season, the club decided to revert to the historical club crest from the 1950s and 60s. This strategic move was made in close collaboration with the fan community and underwent a meticulous planning process spanning several months.

Following the promotion, successful coach Timo Rost bid farewell and embarked on a new journey at Erzgebirge Aue. For the 2022–23 season, Bayreuth appointed Thomas Kleine as their new head coach. Kleine had previously served as an assistant coach at Greuther Fürth and Fortuna Düsseldorf. On the fourth matchday of the 2022–23 3. Liga season, the team celebrated their first points and victory at the third level of German football. This achievement occurred in front of 2,712 spectators at their home stadium, the Hans-Walter-Wild-Stadion. Alexander Nollenberger scored the decisive winning goal against VfL Osnabrück in the 82nd minute with a left-footed shot into the far corner of the goal. By winning the Regionalliga Bayern in the 2021–22 season, SpVgg Bayreuth also earned qualification for the 2022–23 DFB-Pokal. In the first round, they competed in front of a home crowd at a sold-out stadium (14,700 spectators) against 2. Bundesliga club Hamburger SV but suffered a 3–1 defeat after extra time. Luke Hemmerich netted the opening goal for Bayreuth in the 16th minute from a deflected free-kick, while Ransford-Yeboah Königsdörffer equalised for HSV shortly before the end of regular time. In extra time, Sebastian Schonlau and Königsdorffer secured the victory for HSV, resulting in a final score. Bayreuth were unable to retain their status as a 3. Liga side two consecutive seasons, and they suffered relegation finishing bottom of the league on 13 May 2023, after a 4–1 loss to Viktoria Köln.

== Stadium ==
The club's stadium was originally built in 1967. In 2002 it was renamed the Hans-Walter-Wild-Stadion. Hans Walter Wild is the former mayor of Bayreuth.

== Current squad ==
As of 8 September 2026

Note: Flags indicate national team as defined under FIFA eligibility rules; some limited exceptions apply. Players may hold more than one non-FIFA nationality.

No.	Pos.	Nation	Player
3	DF	GER	Dennis Lippert
4	DF	GER	Felix Schäffner
5	DF	GER	Edwin Schwarz
6	MF	GER	Denis Latifovic
7	DF	GER	Marlon Fries
8	FW	GER	Patrick Scheder
9	FW	GER	Kelvin Onuigwe
10	MF	GER	Jann George
11	FW	GER	Niklas Doll
12	MF	GER	Pierre Weber
13	FW	GER	Levi Kraus
14	DF	GER	Lenn Greißinger
16	MF	GER	Marco Zietsch
17	DF	GER	Ben Fischer
18	MF	GER	Dominic Schmidt

No.	Pos.	Nation	Player
19	MF	GER	Tino Lennerth
20	DF	GER	Kurt Pestel
21	GK	GER	Konrad Mayer
22	DF	GER	Niklas Jeck
23	FW	GER	Louis Stöcker
25	GK	GER	Lucas Zahaczewski
27	MF	GER	Florian Markert
28	MF	GER	Fabian Dachsbacher
33	FW	GER	Maximilian Hausmann
37	MF	GER	Moritz Gindel
40	MF	GER	Micah Ham
44	FW	GER	Adrian Heinle
45	GK	GER	Lino Kasten
80	FW	AUT	Erijon Shaqiri

=== Out on loan ===
Note: Flags indicate national team as defined under FIFA eligibility rules; some limited exceptions apply. Players may hold more than one non-FIFA nationality.

No.	Pos.	Nation	Player

== Honours ==
=== League ===
- 2. Bundesliga Süd (II)
  - Runners-up: 1979
- Regionalliga Bayern (IV)
  - Champions: 2022
- Bayernliga (V)
  - Champions: 1959 (north), 1969, 1971, 1985, 1987, 2005, 2008, 2014 (north)
  - Runners-up: 1958 (north), 1995
- Landesliga Bayern-Nord (VI)
  - Champions: 1998, 2001
  - Runners-up: 2000
- 2. Amateurliga Oberfranken Ost (IV)
  - Champions: 1954

=== Youth ===
- Bavarian Under 19 championship
  - Runners-up: 1997
- Bavarian Under 15 championship
  - Champions: 1977
  - Runners-up: 1978

=== Cup ===
- DFB-Pokal
  - Quarter finals: 1976–77, 1979–80
- Bavarian Cup
  - Runners-up: 2006, 2018
- Bavarian League Cup
  - Winners: 2019–21
- Oberfranken Cup
  - Winners: 2001, 2006

== Recent managers ==
Recent managers of the club:

Manager	Start	Finish
Marco Schmidt	1 July 2000	30 June 2003
(Italy) Gino Lettieri	11 September 2003	30 June 2006
Norbert Schlegel	1 July 2006	30 June 2007
Klaus Scheer	1 July 2007	30 June 2010
Ingo Walther	1 July 2010	30 June 2011
Wolfgang Mahr	1 July 2011	12 November 2011
Klaus Rodler	12 November 2011	31 December 2011
Klaus Scheer	1 January 2012	16 April 2012
Jürgen Dörfler	16 April 2012	30 June 2012
Heiko Gröger	1 July 2012	30 June 2014
Dieter Kurth	30 June 2014	28 September 2014
Christoph Starke	29 September 2014	20 August 2016
Marc Reinhardt	21 August 2016	29 October 2017
Christian Stadler	30 October 2017	13 May 2018
Josef Albersinger	14 May 2018	3 September 2018
Timo Rost	3 September 2018	30 June 2022
Thomas Kleine	1 July 2022	7 May 2023
Julian Kolbeck	7 May 2023	30 June 2023
Marek Mintál	1 July 2023	28 April 2024
Lukas Kling	29 April 2024	

== Recent seasons ==
The recent season-by-season performance of the club:

SpVgg Bayreuth

Year	Division	Tier	Position
1999–2000	Landesliga Bayern-Nord	V	2nd
2000–01	Landesliga Bayern-Nord	V	1st ↑
2001–02	Bayernliga	IV	7th
2002–03	Bayernliga	IV	4th
2003–04	Bayernliga	IV	7th
2004–05	Bayernliga	IV	1st ↑
2005–06	Regionalliga Süd	III	10th ↓
2006–07	Bayernliga	IV	3rd
2007–08	Bayernliga	IV	1st
2008–09	Bayernliga	V	4th
2009–10	Bayernliga	V	9th
2010–11	Bayernliga	V	16th ↓
2011–12	Landesliga Bayern-Nord	VI	4th ↑
2012–13	Bayernliga Nord	V	6th
2013–14	Bayernliga Nord	V	1st ↑
2014–15	Regionalliga Bayern	IV	6th
2015–16	Regionalliga Bayern	IV	7th
2016–17	Regionalliga Bayern	IV	12th
2017–18	Regionalliga Bayern	IV	17th
2018–19	Regionalliga Bayern	IV	10th
2019–21	Regionalliga Bayern	IV	3rd
2021–22	Regionalliga Bayern	IV	1st ↑
2022–23	3. Liga	III	20th ↓
2023–24	Regionalliga Bayern	IV	12th
2024–25	Regionalliga Bayern	IV	5th
2025–26	Regionalliga Bayern	IV	13th

SpVgg Bayreuth II

Season	Division	Tier	Position
1999–2000			
2000–01			
2001–02			
2002–03	Bezirksliga Oberfranken-Ost	VII	1st ↑
2003–04	Bezirksoberliga Oberfranken	VI	1st ↑
2004–05	Landesliga Bayern-Nord	V	11th
2005–06	Landesliga Bayern-Nord	V	8th
2006–07	Landesliga Bayern-Nord	V	18th ↓
2007–08	Bezirksoberliga Oberfranken	VI	15th ↓
2008–09	Bezirksliga Oberfranken-Ost	VIII	10th
2009–10	Bezirksliga Oberfranken-Ost	VIII	6th
2010–11	Bezirksliga Oberfranken-Ost	VIII	2nd ↑
2011–12	Bezirksoberliga Oberfranken	VII	16th
2012–13	Bezirksliga Oberfranken-Ost	VII	9th
2013–14	Bezirksliga Oberfranken-Ost	VII	9th
2014–15	Bezirksliga Oberfranken-Ost	VII	6th
2015–16	Bezirksliga Oberfranken-Ost	VII	2nd ↑
2016–17	Landesliga Bayern-Nordost	VI	15th
2017–18	Landesliga Bayern-Nordost	VI	17th ↓
2018–19	Bezirksliga Oberfranken-Ost	VII	5th
2019–21	Bezirksliga Oberfranken-Ost	VII	5th
2021–22	Bezirksliga Oberfranken-Ost	VII	4th
2022–23	Bezirksliga Oberfranken-Ost	VII	2nd ↑
2023–24	Landesliga Bayern-Nordost	VI	14th ↓
2024–25	Bezirksliga Oberfranken-Ost	VII	2nd
2025–26	Bezirksliga Oberfranken-Ost	VII	

- With the introduction of the Bezirksoberligas in 1988 as the new fifth tier, below the Landesligas, all leagues below dropped one tier. With the introduction of the Regionalligas in 1994 and the 3. Liga in 2008 as the new third tier, below the 2. Bundesliga, all leagues below dropped one tier. With the establishment of the Regionalliga Bayern as the new fourth tier in Bavaria in 2012 the Bayernliga was split into a northern and a southern division, the number of Landesligas expanded from three to five and the Bezirksoberligas abolished. All leagues from the Bezirksli*

- With the introduction of the Bezirksoberligas in 1988 as the new fifth tier, below the Landesligas, all leagues below dropped one tier. With the introduction of the Regionalligas in 1994 and the 3. Liga in 2008 as the new third tier, below the 2. Bundesliga, all leagues below dropped one tier. With the establishment of the Regionalliga Bayern as the new fourth tier in Bavaria in 2012 the Bayernliga was split into a northern and a southern division, the number of Landesligas expanded from three to five and the Bezirksoberligas abolished. All leagues from the Bezirksligas onwards were elevated one tier.
- The 2020–21 Regionalliga Bayern season has been cancelled due to the COVID-19 pandemic in Germany, and the original 2019–20 season was extended until spring 2021. In July 2020, the current league leader Türkgücü München was promoted to the 3. Liga and thus suspended from 2019–21 Regionalliga Bayern, and the club's league results have all been annulled. The 2019–21 Regionalliga Bayern champion and participant in the promotion play-offs against the champions of the 2020–21 Regionalliga Nord was determined end of the discontinued season in a double round-robin play-off series with the top three eligible teams Viktoria Aschaffenburg, SpVgg Bayreuth, and 1. FC Schweinfurt 05.

=== Key ===
↑ Promoted	↓ Relegated

== DFB-Pokal appearances ==
The club has qualified for the first round of the DFB-Pokal one quite a number of occasions, reaching the quarter finals in 1979–80 as its best result:

Season	Round	Date	Home	Away	Result	Attendance
1972–73 DFB-Pokal	First round – first leg	10 December 1972	SpVgg Bayreuth	1. FC Kaiserslautern	4–2	
1972–73 DFB-Pokal	First round – second leg	20 December 1972	1. FC Kaiserslautern	SpVgg Bayreuth	4–0	
1974–75 DFB-Pokal	First round	7 September 1974	SpVgg Bayreuth	FC Schalke 04	1–2	
1975–76 DFB-Pokal	First round	1 August 1975	Karlsruher SC	SpVgg Bayreuth	4–2	
1976–77 DFB-Pokal	First round	6 August 1976	Kickers Offenbach	SpVgg Bayreuth	4–4 aet	
1976–77 DFB-Pokal	First round – replay	1 September 1976	SpVgg Bayreuth	Kickers Offenbach	4–1	
1976–77 DFB-Pokal	Second round	16 October 1976	SpVgg Bayreuth	SSV Reutlingen	2–1	
1976–77 DFB-Pokal	Third round	18 December 1976	SpVgg Bayreuth	FV Hassia Bingen	2–1	
1976–77 DFB-Pokal	Fourth round	8 January 1977	SpVgg Bayreuth	FC Augsburg	2–0	
1976–77 DFB-Pokal	Quarterfinals	9 February 1977	SpVgg Bayreuth	Rot-Weiß Essen	1–2	
1977–78 DFB-Pokal	First round	29 July 1977	FC 08 Villingen	SpVgg Bayreuth	0–1	
1977–78 DFB-Pokal	Second round	20 August 1977	Itzehoer SV	SpVgg Bayreuth	1–6	
1977–78 DFB-Pokal	Third round	14 October 1977	Karlsruher SC	SpVgg Bayreuth	2–0	
1978–79 DFB-Pokal	First round	4 August 1978	SV Haidlfing	SpVgg Bayreuth	0–5	
1978–79 DFB-Pokal	Second round	24 September 1978	SpVgg Bayreuth	Melsunger FV	6–0	
1978–79 DFB-Pokal	Third round	2 December 1978	Bayer 04 Leverkusen	SpVgg Bayreuth	1–0	
1979–80 DFB-Pokal	First round	25 August 1979	SpVgg Bayreuth	Preußen 07 Hameln	5–0	
1979–80 DFB-Pokal	Second round	29 September 1979	SpVgg Bayreuth	SpVgg Au/Iller	6–0	
1979–80 DFB-Pokal	Third round	12 January 1980	SpVgg Bayreuth	FC Bayern Munich	1–0	18,000
1979–80 DFB-Pokal	Fourth round	16 February 1980	SpVgg Bayreuth	TuS Langerwehe	5–2 aet	
1979–80 DFB-Pokal	Quarterfinals	6 April 1980	FC Schalke 04	SpVgg Bayreuth	3–1	
1980–81 DFB-Pokal	First round	29 August 1980	Borussia Neunkirchen	SpVgg Bayreuth	1–1 aet	
1980–81 DFB-Pokal	First round – replay	17 September 1980	SpVgg Bayreuth	Borussia Neunkirchen	2–1	
1980–81 DFB-Pokal	Second round	29 August 1980	SpVgg Bayreuth	VfB Stuttgart	1–3	
1981–82 DFB-Pokal	First round	28 August 1981	SpVgg Bayreuth	Bayer Uerdingen	3–1	
1981–82 DFB-Pokal	Second round	11 October 1981	VfB Stuttgart II	SpVgg Bayreuth	1–2	
1981–82 DFB-Pokal	Third round	30 December 1981	SpVgg Bayreuth	VfB Oldenburg	2–0	
1981–82 DFB-Pokal	Fourth round	9 January 1982	SV Werder Bremen	SpVgg Bayreuth	2–0	
1982–83 DFB-Pokal	First round	27 August 1982	SpVgg Bayreuth	SpVgg Fürth	3–1	
1982–83 DFB-Pokal	Second round	15 October 1982	SpVgg Bayreuth	Hertha BSC	0–1	
1983–84 DFB-Pokal	First round	28 August 1983	FC Augsburg	SpVgg Bayreuth	2–1 aet	
1984–85 DFB-Pokal	First round	1 September 1984	SpVgg Bayreuth	SV Mettlach	7–0	
1984–85 DFB-Pokal	Second round	13 October 1984	SpVgg Bayreuth	SG Union Solingen	1–2	
1986–87 DFB-Pokal	First round	27 August 1986	SpVgg Bayreuth	SG Wattenscheid 09	0–3	
1988–89 DFB-Pokal	First round	6 August 1988	Germania Dörnigheim	SpVgg Bayreuth	0–5	
1988–89 DFB-Pokal	Second round	24 September 1988	SV Werder Bremen	SpVgg Bayreuth	6–1	
1989–90 DFB-Pokal	First round	20 August 1989	1. FC Pforzheim	SpVgg Bayreuth	4–1	
1990–91 DFB-Pokal	First round	4 August 1990	SpVgg Bayreuth	Blau-Weiß 90 Berlin	0–3	
2006–07 DFB-Pokal	First round	8 September 2006	SpVgg Bayreuth	Kickers Offenbach	0–2	
2021–22 DFB-Pokal	First round	7 August 2021	SpVgg Bayreuth	Arminia Bielefeld	3–6	5,000
2022–23 DFB-Pokal	First round	30 July 2022	SpVgg Bayreuth	Hamburger SV	1–3 aet	15,000

Source:"DFB-Pokal". Weltfussball.de (in German).
