= Dennis Lippert =

German footballer (born 1996)

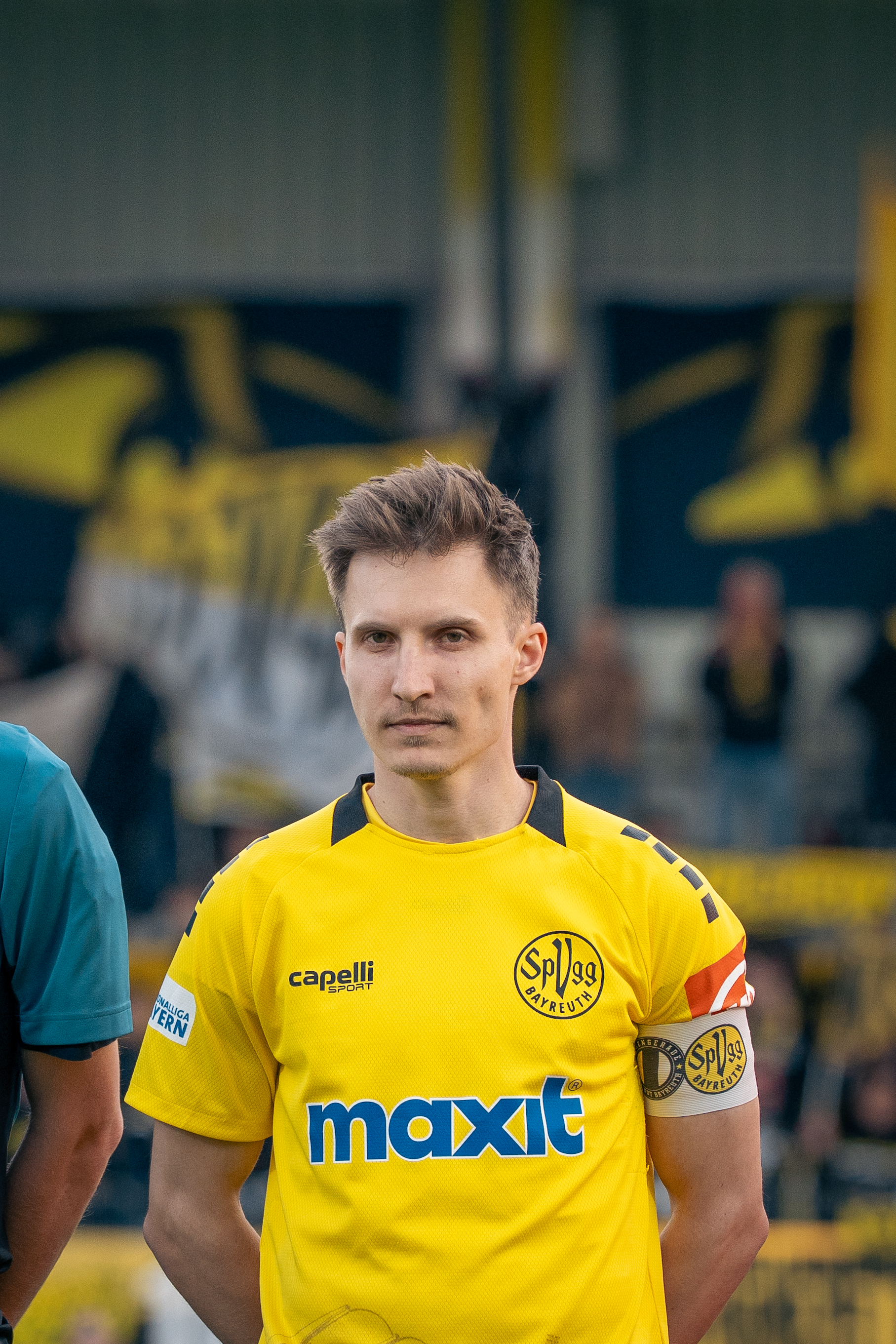
- Lippert in 2026.

Personal information
- Date of birth: 20 February 1996 (age 30)
- Place of birth: Weiden in der Oberpfalz, Germany
- Height: 1.72 m (5 ft 8 in)
- Position: Left-back

Team information
- Current team: SpVgg Bayreuth
- Number: 3

Youth career
- 2003–2012: SpVgg SV Weiden
- 2012–2015: 1. FC Nürnberg

Senior career*
Years	Team	Apps	(Gls)
2015–2020	1. FC Nürnberg II	52	(2)
2017–2019	1. FC Nürnberg	6	(0)
2020–2023	SpVgg Bayreuth	57	(1)
2023–2024	FC 08 Homburg	29	(1)
2024–	SpVgg Bayreuth	59	(1)
- * Club domestic league appearances and goals as of 27 September 2026

Dennis Lippert (born 20 February 1996) is a German professional footballer who plays as a left-back for SpVgg Bayreuth.

== Honours ==
SpVgg Bayreuth

- Regionalliga Bayern: 2021–22
