= Hans-Walter-Wild-Stadion =

Football stadium in Bayreuth, Germany

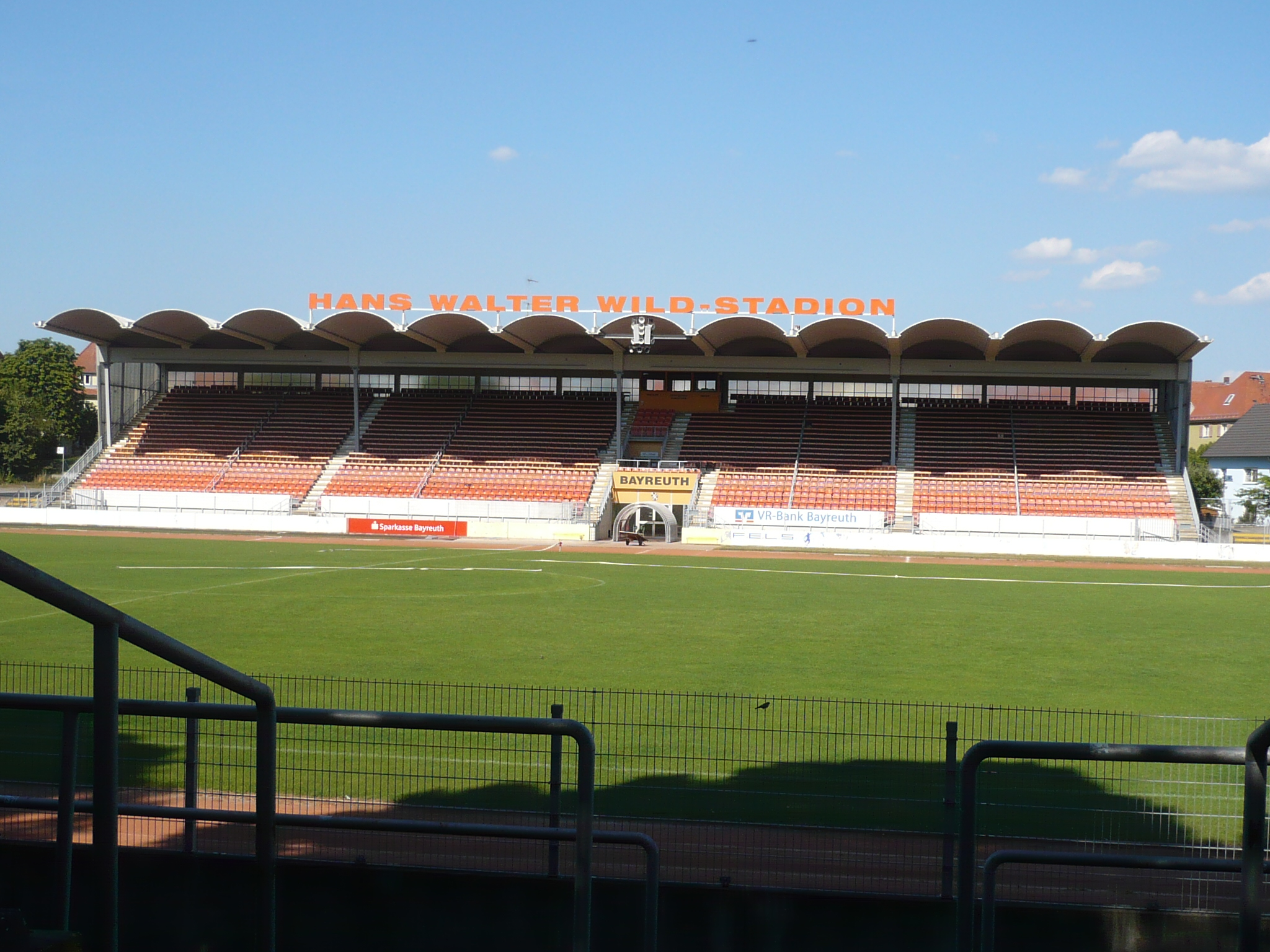
- Interactive map of Hans-Walter-Wild-Stadion
- Full name: Hans-Walter-Wild-Stadion
- Location: Bayreuth, Germany
- Coordinates: 49°56′43″N 11°35′13″E
- Capacity: 21,500
- Surface: Grass

Construction
- Opened: 1967

Tenant
- SpVgg Bayreuth

The Hans-Walter-Wild-Stadion is a multi-purpose stadium in Bayreuth, Germany. It is currently used mostly for football matches and is the home stadium of SpVgg Bayreuth. The stadium is able to hold 21,500 people.

The stadium opened in 1967 and was named after then-mayor Hans Walter Wild, who was the city's longest-serving Lord Mayor (Oberbürgermeister), serving a total of 30 years from 1958 to 1988.

Michael Jackson performed during his Dangerous World Tour on September 2, 1992 in front of 32,000 people.
