= Fabian Schnabel =

German footballer

Personal information
- Date of birth: 18 December 1993 (age 32)
- Place of birth: Passau, Germany
- Height: 1.79 m (5 ft 10 in)
- Position: Forward

Team information
- Current team: SV Schalding-Heining
- Number: 11

Youth career
- Batavia Passau
- –2009: 1. FC Passau
- 2009–2011: SV Ried

Senior career*
Years	Team	Apps	(Gls)
2011–2013	SV Ried II	37	(1)
2013–2014	SV Grieskirchen	29	(10)
2014–2015	Union Vöcklamarkt	15	(0)
2015–2017	FC Blau-Weiß Linz	45	(4)
2017	→ Union St. Florian (loan)	12	(4)
2017–2018	SV Schalding-Heining	20	(13)
2018	FSV Zwickau	6	(1)
2018–	SV Schalding-Heining	160	(44)
- * Club domestic league appearances and goals as of 20 July 2024

Fabian Schnabel (born 18 December 1993) is a German footballer who plays as a forward for Bayernliga club SV Schalding-Heining.
