= Franz Schick =

German footballer (born 1960)

Personal information
- Date of birth: 22 June 1960 (age 66)
- Position: Forward

Senior career*
Years	Team	Apps	(Gls)
–1982	TSV Ampfing		
1982–1984	1860 Munich	31	(15)
1984–1986	TSV Ampfing	84	(86)
1986–1987	VfL Bochum	4	(0)
1987–1994	TSV Ampfing		

Managerial career
- SV Nußdorf
- SC Baldham
- 2003–?: Falke Markt Schwaben
- * Club domestic league appearances and goals

Franz Schick (born 22 June 1960) is a German former professional footballer who played as a forward. Schick, while only making a very limited impact on professional football, playing four times for VfL Bochum in the Bundesliga, had his greatest success with third division side TSV Ampfing, where he became the top scorer of the Bayernliga on five occasions.

== Career ==
Schick, while playing for the TSV Ampfing in the third-division Bayernliga, became the league's most successful goal scorer. He took out the honours of the league's top scorer on five occasions, 1980-81 (30), 1981–82 (29), 1984–85 (34), 1985–86 (34) and 1987–88 (29), all while with Ampfing. All up, he scored 217 goals in the league. Ampfing had gained promotion to the Bayernliga in 1979 and was relegated again in 1989, never to return.

He left Ampfing during the 1982-83 season to join 1860 Munich; but was not quite as successful at his new club, scoring only 20 goals that season, and he returned to his old club during the following season. Schick spend a short stint with Bundesliga side VfL Bochum in the 1986-87 season but made only four appearances for the club and promptly returned to Ampfing.

In 1980-81, 1985-86 and 1987–88, Schick was the best goalscorer in all of the German Amateur-Oberligas.

After his player career, Schick turned to coaching, coaching amateur sides SV Nußdorf and SC Baldham, before joining Bayernliga side Falke Markt Schwaben in January 2003.

== Career statistics ==
Appearances and goals by club, season and competition
Club	Season	League		
Club	Season	Division	Apps	Goals
TSV Ampfing	1980–81	Bayernliga		30
TSV Ampfing	1981–82	Bayernliga		29
TSV Ampfing	1982–83	Bayernliga		9
1860 Munich	1982–83	Bayernliga	15	11
1860 Munich	1983–84	Bayernliga	16	4
TSV Ampfing	1983–84	Bayernliga		18
TSV Ampfing	1984–85	Bayernliga		34
TSV Ampfing	1985–86	Bayernliga		34
VfL Bochum	1986–87	Bundesliga	4	0
TSV Ampfing	1986–87	Bayernliga		
TSV Ampfing	1987–88	Bayernliga		29

== Honours ==
- Bayernliga top scorer: 1980–81, 1981–82, 1984–85, 1985–86, 1987–88
