= Freier TuS Regensburg =

German football club

- Full name: Freier Turn- und Sportverein Regensburg von 1911 e.V.
- Founded: 1911
- Chairman: Anton Zimmermann
- Manager: Nico Beigang
- League: Kreisliga Regensburg (VIII)
- 2015–16: 5th
Home colours	Away colours

The Freier TuS Regensburg is a German association football club from the city of Regensburg, Bavaria.

The club's greatest success came in 2009–10, when it earned promotion to Bavaria's highest state league, the Fußball-Bayernliga, which the club played in for just one season.

== History ==
The club was formed on 15 June 1911, under the name of Freie Turnerschaft Regensburg, initially as a gymnastics club with its members predominantly drawn from the local working class. The club soon expanded to include other sports departments, including football.

With the rise of the Nazis to power in 1933, Freier TuS, like most other clubs that were organised within the working-class Arbeiter-Turn- und Sportbund, was outlawed and its assets confiscated. The former members had to find a new home, which many did in the local railway men's sports club, ESV Regensburg. After the end of the Second World War, the club reformed in 1946 and was eventually able to have its assets returned.

On the football field, the club did not rise above local level for most of its history, with football in Regensburg being firmly dominated by Jahn Regensburg.

TuS was a founding member of the Bezirksoberliga Oberpfalz in 1988 but lasted for only one season, being relegated back to the Bezirksliga after winning only two games all season. The club made a return to the Bezirksoberliga in 1992, after a tile in the Bezirksliga Oberpfalz-Süd, after which the side was more competitive at this level.

In 1997, the club was very successful in indoor competitions, winning the Upper Palatinate and Bavarian Indoor Football Championships. After promotion to the tier-five Landesliga Bayern-Mitte in 1997 through a second place in the Bezirksoberliga, TuS played for thirteen seasons at this level. The first eight seasons of those, it played as a mid- to lower table side but, in 2005–06, the side finished second in the league and qualified for the Bayernliga promotion round, where it was unsuccessful. Results in the Landesliga were much healthier after that and the club eventually took out the league championship in 2010 and earned promotion to the Fußball-Bayernliga for the first time.

At this level, TuS was outclassed and suffered immediate relegation back to the Landesliga after coming a distant last in the league. After two seasons in the Landesliga in which the club finished in the bottom third it had to defeat its league place in the relegation round. After initial success TuS was relegated to the Bezirksliga after two losses against ASV Burglengenfeld. At the end of the 2014–15 season the club suffered another relegation, now to the Kreisliga.

== Notable players ==
- (Germany) Markus Giesecke
- (Germany) Markus Smarzoch

== Honours ==
The club's honours:

=== League ===
- Landesliga Bayern-Mitte
  - Champions: 2010
  - Runners-up: 2006
- Bezirksoberliga Oberpfalz
  - Runners-up: 1997
- Bezirksliga Oberpfalz-Süd
  - Champions: 1992

=== Indoor ===
- 1x Bavarian Indoor Football Champions (1997)
- 5x Upper Palatinate Indoor Football Champions (1987, 1997, 1998, 1999, 2000)

== Recent seasons ==
The recent season-by-season performance of the club:

Season	Division	Tier	Position
1999–2000	Landesliga Bayern-Mitte	V	9th
2000–01	Landesliga Bayern-Mitte	V	6th
2001–02	Landesliga Bayern-Mitte	V	11th
2002–03	Landesliga Bayern-Mitte	V	12th
2003–04	Landesliga Bayern-Mitte	V	12th
2004–05	Landesliga Bayern-Mitte	V	7th
2005–06	Landesliga Bayern-Mitte	V	2nd
2006–07	Landesliga Bayern-Mitte	V	6th
2007–08	Landesliga Bayern-Mitte	V	7th
2008–09	Landesliga Bayern-Mitte	VI	4th
2009–10	Landesliga Bayern-Mitte	VI	1st ↑
2010–11	Bayernliga	V	18th ↓
2011–12	Landesliga Bayern-Mitte	VI	19th
2012–13	Landesliga Bayern-Mitte	VI	17th ↓
2013–14	Bezirksliga Oberpfalz-Süd	VII	4th
2014–15	Bezirksliga Oberpfalz-Süd	VII	13th ↓
2015–16	Kreisliga Regensburg	VIII	5th
2016–17	Kreisliga Regensburg	VIII	6th
2017–18	Kreisliga Regensburg	VIII	13th ↓
2018–19	Kreisklasse 2	IX	2nd ↑
2019–20	Kreisliga Regensburg	VIII	

- With the introduction of the Bezirksoberligas in 1988 as the new fifth tier, below the Landesligas, all leagues below dropped one tier. With the introduction of the Regionalligas in 1994 and the 3. Liga in 2008 as the new third tier, below the 2. Bundesliga, all leagues below dropped one tier. With the establishment of the Regionalliga Bayern as the new fourth tier in Bavaria in 2012 the Bayernliga was split into a northern and a southern division, the number of Landesligas expanded from three to five and the Bezirksoberligas abolished. All leagues from the Bezirksligas onwards were elevated one tier.

↑ Promoted	↓ Relegated
