= TSV Schwaben Augsburg =

German football club

- Full name: Turn- und Sportverein 1847 Schwaben Augsburg e. V.
- Founded: 1847
- Ground: Rosenaustadion
- Capacity: 28,000
- Manager: Marco Zupur
- League: Regionalliga Bayern (IV)
- 2025–26: Regionalliga Bayern, 15th of 18
Home colours	Away colours

TSV Schwaben Augsburg is a German football club which is part of a larger sports association whose origins go back to the 1847 formation of the gymnastics club Turnverein Augsburg. The association's football department was formed in 1907 and after 29 March 1919 played as Schwaben Augsburg.

== History ==
Local bylaws required the formation of a fire brigade and in 1848 the members of TV also formed the Augsburger Freiwillige Feuerwehr. In 1853, TV was banned for political reasons by authorities fearful of democratic leanings, but managed to carry on as a physical fitness group until being re-established in 1860. Some members left the club in 1863 to form MTV Augsburg, the first of several clubs spawned by the departure of TV including TSV 1871 Augsburg, TSV 1875 Göggingen, MTV 1889 Augsburg, and TSG 1890 Thannhausen. In 1907, former TV members also established FC Augsburg.

MTV 1863 Augsburg had re-united with its parent club in 1868 and in 1919, after the end of World War I, MTV 1889 also returned to the fold. That same year the club was also joined by the members of SV Augsburg which had been established in 1905 as FC Pfersee.

=== Interwar period ===
The comings and goings of TV club members continued in the interwar period. The women of Turnclub Augsburg and Damenschwimmverein Augsburg joined in 1919 and 1920 respectively. SV Schwaben was formed in 1924 by footballers, hockey players, and track and field athletes out of TV, while the fencers left in 1925 to form Fechtclub Augsburg. That same year TV partnered up with TSV 1925 Meitingen. TV offshoots SV Schwaben and SSV Augsburg (originally FC Augsburg) merged to become Sport- und Spielvereine (SSV) Schwaben Augsburg. And in 1933, FC Viktoria and Schwimmverein Delphi joined TV. Throughout this period the club's football side made frequent appearances in the Bezirksliga Bayern, but without producing any significant results.

=== Play during World War II ===
In 1933, German football was reorganized under the Third Reich into sixteen top-flight divisions. Schwaben Augsburg joined the Gauliga Bayern, but was relegated after just two seasons. The club returned to first-division play in 1937, but again only stayed up for two years. Schwaben was promoted once more in 1940, while the team's parent club TV Augsburg was forced by Nazi sports authorities into a merger with SSV Schwaben Augsburg to form TSV Schwaben Augsburg in 1941. The football team remained in a weakened Gauliga until the end of World War II playing as a lower to mid-table side.

=== Postwar ===
After the war occupying Allied authorities ordered the dissolution of all organizations in Germany, including sports and football associations. Former TSV footballers formed FC Viktoria Augsburg (later 1948 TG Viktoria) in late 1945. TSV itself was re-constituted in 1946 and its football department continued to compete in first-division football in the Oberliga Süd in 15 of the next 20 years with their best result coming as a fifth-place finish in 1946. In this period, the club managed to march from the Oberliga straight down to the Amateurliga Bayern (III), and back, in consecutive seasons, an unusual achievement. After the formation of the Bundesliga – Germany's first professional league – in 1963, the club played in the second division Regionalliga Süd until being relegated in 1969.

=== Out of professional football ===
That same year Schwaben's professional footballers left to join forces with their fellows at BC Augsburg to form FC Augsburg, while parent association TSV agreed to exclude themselves from participation in professional football in the future. Nonetheless, Schwaben continued to operate a football department, being joined by the footballers of Eintracht Augsburg in 1970. The team went on to advance to the highest amateur class, the Bayernliga (IV), by 1981.

For many years then, the club played as a yo-yo side moving between the Oberliga and the fifth-division Landesliga Bayern-Süd. After one more relegation from the Oberliga in 2002, the club remained in the Landesliga. In 2007, it found itself back in the highest league of the Schwaben FA, the Bezirksoberliga Schwaben, for the first time since 1975. There the club struggled too and could not avoid further relegation, to the Bezirksliga Schwaben-Süd, in 2008.

In the Bezirksliga, the club met the BC Augsburg-Oberhausen, a club named and based on the old BC Augsburg. The team managed to break their fall through the leagues in 2008–09, finishing second behind BCA-O and earning promotion back to the Bezirksoberliga, where it played for the following three seasons.

At the end of the 2011–12 season, the club dropped back to the Bezirksliga after finishing 15th in the Bezirksoberliga but remained at the same tier as the Bezirksoberliga was disbanded. Schwaben long looked like achieving direct promotion back to the Landesliga in 2012–13 but eventually finished only second and was knocked out in the promotion play-off. Two successive league championships between 2015–16 and 2016–17 earned Schwaben promotion from the Bezirksliga to the Bayernliga Süd. In the 2023–24 season, Schwaben Augsburg was promoted from the Bayernliga to the Regionalliga Bayern as the only licensed third-placed southern team, as the top two teams, SV Erlbach and SV Heimstetten, decided not to be promoted.

== Honours ==
The club's honours:

=== League ===
- 2nd Oberliga Süd (II)
  - Champions: 1954
  - Runners-up: 1961
- Bayernliga-Süd (III)
  - Champions: 1959, 1960
- Landesliga Bayern-Süd (IV-V)
  - Champions: 1991, 1998
  - Runners-up: 1981, 1988, 2002
- Bezirksliga Schwaben-Süd (VII)
  - Champions: 2016
  - Runners-up: 2013

=== Cup ===
- Southern German Cup
  - Winners: 1922
- Schwaben Cup
  - Winners: 1959
  - Runners-up: 1997

== TSV Schwaben Augsburg seasons ==
The club's seasons since 1945:

Year	Division	Tier	Position
1945–46	Oberliga Süd	I	4th
1946–47	Oberliga Süd	I	8th
1947–48	Oberliga Süd	I	11th
1948–49	Oberliga Süd	I	7th
1949–50	Oberliga Süd	I	11th
1950–51	Oberliga Süd	I	13th
1951–52	Oberliga Süd	I	15th ↓
1952–53	2. Oberliga Süd	II	5th
1953–54	2. Oberliga Süd	II	1st ↑
1954–55	Oberliga Süd	I	8th
1955–56	Oberliga Süd	I	12th
1956–57	Oberliga Süd	I	15th ↓
1957–58	2. Oberliga Süd	II	17th ↓
1958–59	Amateurliga Bayern-Süd	III	1st
1959–60	Amateurliga Bayern-Süd	III	1st ↑
1960–61	2. Oberliga Süd	II	2nd ↑
1961–62	Oberliga Süd	I	13th
1962–63	Oberliga Süd	I	15th ↓
1963–64	Regionalliga Süd	II	4th
1964–65	Regionalliga Süd	II	16th
1965–66	Regionalliga Süd	II	11th
1966–67	Regionalliga Süd	II	9th
1967–68	Regionalliga Süd	II	13th
1968–69	Regionalliga Süd	II	17th ↓
1969–70	C-Klasse Augsburg	VIII	2nd ↑
1970–71	B-Klasse Augsburg	VII	1st ↑
1971–72	A-Klasse Augsburg-Ost	VI	2nd
1972–73	A-Klasse Augsburg-Ost	VI	1st ↑
1973–74	Bezirksliga Schwaben-Süd	V	14th
1974–75	Bezirksliga Schwaben-Süd	V	1st ↑
1975–76	Landesliga Bayern-Süd	IV	13th
1976–77	Landesliga Bayern-Süd	IV	15th
1977–78	Landesliga Bayern-Süd	IV	14th
1978–79	Landesliga Bayern-Süd	IV	5th
1979–80	Landesliga Bayern-Süd	IV	3rd
1980–81	Landesliga Bayern-Süd	IV	2nd ↑
1981–82	Bayernliga	III	12th
1982–83	Bayernliga	III	8th
1983–84	Bayernliga	III	20th ↓
1984–85	Landesliga Bayern-Süd	IV	10th

Year	Division	Tier	Position
1985–86	Landesliga Bayern-Süd	IV	6th
1986–87	Landesliga Bayern-Süd	IV	8th
1987–88	Landesliga Bayern-Süd	IV	2nd ↑
1988–89	Bayernliga	III	12th
1989–90	Bayernliga	III	14th ↓
1990–91	Landesliga Bayern-Süd	IV	1st ↑
1991–92	Bayernliga	III	15th ↓
1992–93	Landesliga Bayern-Süd	IV	13th
1993–94	Landesliga Bayern-Süd	IV	8th
1994–95	Landesliga Bayern-Süd	V	3rd
1995–96	Landesliga Bayern-Süd	V	12th
1996–97	Landesliga Bayern-Süd	V	10th
1997–98	Landesliga Bayern-Süd	V	1st ↑
1998–99	Bayernliga	IV	15th
1999–2000	Bayernliga	IV	14th
2000–01	Bayernliga	IV	17th ↓
2001–02	Landesliga Bayern-Süd	V	2nd ↑
2002–03	Bayernliga	IV	16th ↓
2003–04	Landesliga Bayern-Süd	V	9th
2004–05	Landesliga Bayern-Süd	V	7th
2005–06	Landesliga Bayern-Süd	V	15th
2006–07	Landesliga Bayern-Süd	V	18th ↓
2007–08	Bezirksoberliga Schwaben	VI	14th ↓
2008–09	Bezirksliga Schwaben-Süd	VIII	2nd ↑
2009–10	Bezirksoberliga Schwaben	VII	3rd
2010–11	Bezirksoberliga Schwaben	VII	12th
2011–12	Bezirksoberliga Schwaben	VII	15th
2012–13	Bezirksliga Schwaben-Süd	VII	2nd
2013–14	Bezirksliga Schwaben-Süd	VII	4th
2014–15	Bezirksliga Schwaben-Süd	VII	4th
2015–16	Bezirksliga Schwaben-Süd	VII	1st ↑
2016–17	Landesliga Bayern-Südwest	VI	1st ↑
2017–18	Bayernliga Süd	V	5th
2018–19	Bayernliga Süd	V	12th
2019–21	Bayernliga Süd	V	16th
2021–22	Bayernliga Süd	V	8th
2022–23	Bayernliga Süd	V	7th
2023–24	Bayernliga Süd	V	3rd ↑
2024–25	Regionalliga Bayern	IV	14th
2025–26	Regionalliga Bayern	IV	15th

- With the introduction of the Bezirksoberligas in 1988 as the new fifth tier, below the Landesligas, all leagues below dropped one tier. With the introduction of the Regionalligas in 1994 and the 3. Liga in 2008 as the new third tier, below the 2. Bundesliga, all leagues below dropped one tier. With the establishment of the Regionalliga Bayern as the new fourth tier in Bavaria in 2012 the Bayernliga was split into a northern and a southern division, the number of Landesligas expanded from three to five and the Bezirksoberligas abolished. All leagues from the Bezirksligas onwards were elevated one tier.

↑ Promoted	↓ Relegated

== Current squad ==
As of 8 September 2026

Note: Flags indicate national team as defined under FIFA eligibility rules; some limited exceptions apply. Players may hold more than one non-FIFA nationality.

No.	Pos.	Nation	Player
1	GK	GER	Maximilian Reil
3	DF	GER	Nicola Della Schiava
5	DF	GER	Dennis Ruisinger
6	MF	GER	Jakob Krauss
7	FW	GER	Kevin Markowski
8	MF	GER	Felix Schwarzholz
9	FW	GER	Bastian Kurz
10	MF	GER	Lukas Ramser
11	FW	GER	Rasmus Fackler-Stamm
13	MF	GER	Mourice Ebeling
14	MF	GER	Marco Greisel
16	MF	GER	Jaden Waigl
17	FW	GER	Yamin H-Wold
19	FW	GER	Mark Radoki

No.	Pos.	Nation	Player
20	FW	GER	Jonas Greppmeier
21	FW	GER	Benjamin Omenlo
22	DF	GER	Benedikt Krug
23	MF	CRO	Marco Luburic
24	DF	GER	Elias Herzig
25	GK	GER	Elias Rogg
27	FW	GER	Michael Schäfer
28	DF	GER	Tristan Eschweiler
29	DF	AUT	Ante Banden
30	MF	GER	Levis Schaber
33	DF	GER	Taha Bektas
35	GK	CRO	Danis Muminovic
36	DF	TUR	Kaan Bengi
37	FW	GER	Johannes Rehwald

== Famous players ==
Players that have played internationally while playing for the club:

- Jānis Bebris, Latvian international
- Ulrich Biesinger, German international
- Karl Burger, German international
- Ernst Lehner, German international
- Oskar Rohr, German international

Players that have played for a professional club before or after playing for the club:

- Katharina Böhm
- Jürgen Haller
- Julian Kania
- Thomas Meggle
- Marcus Müller
- Melike Pekel
- Janos Radoki
- Rudolf Sandner
- Armin Veh
- Anna Wellmann

== Stadium ==
From 1951 to 1965, Schwaben shared the Rosenaustadion with BC Augsburg until moving to the Sportanlage Süd. A new Ernst-Lehner-Stadion was built there in 1996 and named Ernst-Lehner-Stadion to honour the former player who was capped 65 times (55 while with Schwaben). He played in the 1934 and 1938 World Cups and was the second-most capped player for Germany in the first half of the century after Paul Janes.

== Other sports departments ==
In addition to its football side Turn- und Sportverein Schwaben Augsburg participates in a large number of other sports including badminton, basketball, boxing, figure skating, fistball, fencing, ice hockey, canoeing and kayaking, athletics, tennis, table tennis, gymnastics, and winter sports. The club has enjoyed successes that include a gold medal in fencing for Heidi Schmid at the 1960 Olympic Games in Rome. Their most outstanding results have come in kayaking and include a silver medal at the 1972 Munich games and gold medals by club members Elisabeth Micheler (1992, Barcelona) and Oliver Fix (1996, Atlanta).
