= TSV Ampfing =

German football club

- Full name: Turn- und Sportverein 1927 Ampfing e.V.
- Founded: 19 May 1927
- Ground: Isenstadion
- Capacity: 10,000
- Manager: Jochen Reil
- League: Landesliga Bayern-Südost (VI)
- 2018–19: Bezirksliga Oberbayern-Ost (VII), 1st (promoted)
Home colours	Away colours

TSV Ampfing is a German football club from the city of Ampfing, Bavaria.

== History ==
The club was established 19 May 1927 as the gymnastics club Turn- und Sportverein Ampfing and first formed a football department in 1931. The club was lost in the aftermath of World War II when occupying Allied authorities banned most organizations across the country, including sports and football clubs. It was reestablished 14 September 1949.

TSV was a third division side in the Amateuroberliga Bayern from 1979 to 1989 with the team's best result coming as third-place finish in 1985. Franz Schick, playing for Ampfing in the Oberliga, finished as the league's top-scorer in 1981, 1982, 1985, 1986 and 1988. The club also appeared in the 1979–80 DFB-Pokal, where it was knocked-out in the first round. After finishing 14th in 1989 the club was relegated to the Landesliga Bayern-Süd (IV) where, with the exception of the 1996–97 season spent in the Bezirksoberliga Oberbayern (VI), they would play until 2002. They slipped to the Bezirksliga Oberbayern-Ost (VII) in 2006 and, after winning the title there in 2009, return to the Bezirksoberliga (VII) in 2010.

At the end of the 2011–12 season the club qualified for the promotion round to the newly expanded Landesliga after finishing 12th in the Bezirksoberliga. In this round it earned promotion through a victory in a penalty shoot out over TSV 1860 Rosenheim II. After two difficult seasons in the Landesliga the club was relegated back to the Bezirksliga in 2014. In the 2018–19 season Ampfing earned promotion to the Landesliga again after another Bezirksliga championship.

In addition to its football side the club has departments for gymnastics, karate, skiing, table tennis, and tennis.

== Honors ==
=== League ===
- Landesliga Bayern-Süd (IV)
  - Champions: 1979
- Bezirksoberliga Oberbayern (VI)
  - Champions: 1997
- Bezirksliga Oberbayern-Ost (V-VIII)
  - Champions: 1975, 1978, 2009, 2019
  - Runners-up: 1976, 2008

== Recent seasons ==
The recent season-by-season performance of the club:

Year	Division	Tier	Position
1999–2000	Landesliga Bayern-Süd	V	5th
2000–01	Landesliga Bayern-Süd	V	11th
2001–02	Landesliga Bayern-Süd	V	15th ↓
2002–03	Bezirksoberliga Oberbayern	VI	9th
2003–04	Bezirksoberliga Oberbayern	VI	3rd
2004–05	Bezirksoberliga Oberbayern	VI	11th
2005–06	Bezirksoberliga Oberbayern	VI	15th ↓
2006–07	Bezirksliga Oberbayern-Ost	VII	5th
2007–08	Bezirksliga Oberbayern-Ost	VII	2nd
2008–09	Bezirksliga Oberbayern-Ost	VIII	1st ↑
2009–10	Bezirksoberliga Oberbayern	VII	7th
2010–11	Bezirksoberliga Oberbayern	VII	4th
2011–12	Bezirksoberliga Oberbayern	VII	12th ↑
2012–13	Landesliga Bayern-Südost	VI	13th
2013–14	Landesliga Bayern-Südost	VI	17th ↓
2014–15	Bezirksliga Oberbayern-Ost	VII	4th
2015–16	Bezirksliga Oberbayern-Ost	VII	5th
2016–17	Bezirksliga Oberbayern-Ost	VII	6th
2017–18	Bezirksliga Oberbayern-Ost	VII	8th
2018–19	Bezirksliga Oberbayern-Ost	VII	1st ↑

- With the introduction of the Bezirksoberligas in 1988 as the new fifth tier, below the Landesligas, all leagues below dropped one tier. With the introduction of the Regionalligas in 1994 and the 3. Liga in 2008 as the new third tier, below the 2. Bundesliga, all leagues below dropped one tier. With the establishment of the Regionalliga Bayern as the new fourth tier in Bavaria in 2012 the Bayernliga was split into a northern and a southern division, the number of Landesligas expanded from three to five and the Bezirksoberligas abolished. All leagues from the Bezirksligas onwards were elevated one tier.

↑ Promoted	↓ Relegated

== DFB Cup appearances ==
The club has qualified for the first round of the German Cup only once:

Season	Round	Date	Home	Away	Result	Attendance
1979–80 DFB-Pokal	First round	25 August 1979	TSV Ampfing	Bramfelder SV	1–2 aet	

Source:"DFB-Pokal" (in German). Weltfussball.de.
