= SV Schalding-Heining =

German football club

- Full name: Sportverein Schalding-Heining e. V.
- Founded: 22 May 1946
- Ground: Städtische Sportanlage
- Chairman: Wolfgang Wagner
- Manager: Anton Autengruber
- League: Bayernliga Süd (V)
- 2025–26: Bayernliga Süd, 13th of 17
Home colours	Away colours	Third colours

SV Schalding-Heining is a German association football club from the suburb of Schalding-Heining in the city of Passau, Bavaria. The club was the first winner of the Bavarian Cup, in 1998.

== History ==
The club was formed on 22 May 1946, after the Second World War, mostly from players of the FC Rittsteig, which had gone defunct during the war. The formation was initiated by a friendly between the villages of Schalding and Heining, which ended 0–0. Originally, the club name was simply SV Schalding but in the early 1950s it was altered to SV Schalding-Heining.

The club achieved some immediate success, winning its league, the C-Klasse Passau and earning promotion to the B-Klasse Passau in 1947. For the next forty years, the SV S-H would fluctuate between the local A-Klasse and C-Klasse, the later being the lowest tier of league football in Bavaria.

In 1989, the club for the first time managed to leave the local leagues, earning promotion to the Bezirksliga Niederbayern-Ost (VI). After a short stint and relegation, it returned to this level in 1992. This time with more success, the SV survived in this league and earned promotion to the Bezirksoberliga Niederbayern in 1994, the highest league in the Lower Bavaria region.

It earned a league championship in the BOL in its first season but chose to decline promotion to the next level up at this stage. A second title in this league in 1999 however meant the SV now accepted promotion, to the Landesliga Bayern-Mitte, the league the club would spend its time in since then a second place in 2007 being its greatest success. In this season, 2006–07, the club managed to win 14 games in a row which contributed largely to this achievement. This qualified the team for the promotion round where it lost to TSV Grossbardorf 2–3 after leading 2–0 after 11 minutes.

While the club remained an undistinguished league side, it achieved far more success on local cup level, rising as far becoming the first team to win the Bavarian Cup in 1998. Through this, the club gained entry to the DFB Cup 1998–99, where it lost narrowly to SpVgg Unterhaching in the first round of the competition. Additionally, the club also won the Niederbayern Cup on four occasions, in 1998, 2003, 2007 and 2009.

The club was in its eleventh Landesliga season in 2008–09 when it finally won promotion to the Oberliga Bayern, after coming first in the league. It also is won the Niederbayern Cup once more.

It only lasted for two seasons in Bavaria's highest league, being relegated in 2011. In the 2011–12 season the team came second in the Landesliga and earned the right to take part in the promotion round to the new Regionalliga Bayern. While the club was knocked out in the first round by FC Schweinfurt 05 it nevertheless qualified for an expanded Bayernliga from 2012.

In the 2012–13 season the club took out the championship in the southern division of the Bayernliga and thereby earned direct promotion to the Regionalliga Bayern. In its first season at this level the club finished twelfth in the league and avoided relegation or the relegation play-offs.

== Local rivals ==
Traditionally, the biggest club in the city of Passau is the FC Passau but the SV Schalding-Heining and the FCP have rarely played in the same league. From 2000 to 2003 and again in 2006–07, both clubs competed in the Landesliga. The FCP has since dropped down to the Bezirksoberliga, making the SV S-H the number one in town, for the time.

== Current squad ==
As of 2 February 2024

Note: Flags indicate national team as defined under FIFA eligibility rules; some limited exceptions apply. Players may hold more than one non-FIFA nationality.

No.	Pos.	Nation	Player
1	GK	GER	Max Böhnke
4	GK	GER	Walter Kirschner
5	DF	GER	Christoph Szili
6	MF	GER	Laban Saeed
7	MF	GER	Maximilian Moser
8	MF	GER	Johannes Stingl
9	FW	GER	Patrick Drofa
10	MF	GER	Christian Brückl
11	FW	GER	Fabian Schnabel
14	DF	HUN	Mátyás Jr Jurácsik
17	MF	GER	Quirin Stiglbauer
18	DF	AUT	Jonas Rossdorfer
19	FW	GER	Andreas Drexler
20	FW	GER	David Vogl

No.	Pos.	Nation	Player
21	DF	GER	Sebastian Raml
22	GK	GER	Daniel Schedlbauer
23	GK	GER	Philipp Röckl
24	FW	GER	Dominik Weiß
26	DF	GER	Markus Tschugg
27	DF	GER	Nico Ott
28	MF	GER	Philipp Knochner
30	DF	GER	Alexander Kurz
31	DF	GER	Daniel Zillner
32	FW	GER	Markus Gallmaier
33	MF	GER	Jonas Goß
34	FW	GER	Tahsin Kabak
44	MF	ALB	Senad Sallaku
45	FW	GER	Noah Aklassou

== Honours ==
The club's honours:

=== League ===
- Bayernliga Süd (V)
  - Champions: 2013, 2023
- Landesliga Bayern-Mitte (VI)
  - Champions: 2009
  - Runners-up: 2007, 2012
- Bezirksoberliga Niederbayern (VI)
  - Champions: (2) 1995, 1999
  - Runners-up: 1997

=== Cup ===
- Bavarian Cup
  - Winners: 1998
  - Runners-up: 2014
- Niederbayern Cup
  - Winners: (4) 1998, 2003, 2007, 2009
  - Runners-up: (2) 2000, 2006

== Recent seasons ==
The recent season-by-season performance of the club:

Season	Division	Tier	Position
1999–2000	Landesliga Bayern-Mitte	V	5th
2000–01	Landesliga Bayern-Mitte	V	10th
2001–02	Landesliga Bayern-Mitte	V	5th
2002–03	Landesliga Bayern-Mitte	V	11th
2003–04	Landesliga Bayern-Mitte	V	4th
2004–05	Landesliga Bayern-Mitte	V	13th
2005–06	Landesliga Bayern-Mitte	V	10th
2006–07	Landesliga Bayern-Mitte	V	2nd
2007–08	Landesliga Bayern-Mitte	V	5th
2008–09	Landesliga Bayern-Mitte	VI	1st ↑
2009–10	Bayernliga	V	13th
2010–11	Bayernliga	V	17th ↓
2011–12	Landesliga Bayern-Mitte	VI	2nd ↑
2012–13	Bayernliga Süd	V	1st ↑
2013–14	Regionalliga Bayern	IV	12th
2014–15	Regionalliga Bayern	IV	12th
2015–16	Regionalliga Bayern	IV	13th
2016–17	Regionalliga Bayern	IV	14th
2017–18	Regionalliga Bayern	IV	11th
2018–19	Regionalliga Bayern	IV	

- With the introduction of the Bezirksoberligas in 1988 as the new fifth tier, below the Landesligas, all leagues below dropped one tier. With the introduction of the Regionalligas in 1994 and the 3. Liga in 2008 as the new third tier, below the 2. Bundesliga, all leagues below dropped one tier. With the establishment of the Regionalliga Bayern as the new fourth tier in Bavaria in 2012 the Bayernliga was split into a northern and a southern division, the number of Landesligas expanded from three to five and the Bezirksoberligas abolished. All leagues from the Bezirksligas onward were elevated one tier.

↑ Promoted	↓ Relegated

== DFB Cup ==
The club only reached the first round of the national German Cup, the DFB Cup, once, in 1998:

Round	Date	Home	Away	Result	Attendance
First round	28 August 1998	SV Schalding-Heining	SpVgg Unterhaching	0–1	2,200
