= TSV 1860 Rosenheim =

German sport club

- Full name: Turn- und Sportverein 1860 Rosenheim e.V.
- Nickname: 60er
- Founded: 1860; 166 years ago
- Ground: Jahnstadion
- Capacity: 6,000
- Chairman: Herbert Borrmann
- Manager: Klaus Seidel
- League: Bayernliga Süd (V)
- 2025–26: Landesliga Bayern Südost, 1st of 18 (promoted)
Home colours	Away colours

TSV 1860 Rosenheim is a German association sport club from the town of Rosenheim, Bavaria. The origins of the club are in the establishment of the gymnastics club and community fire brigade Freiwillige Turnerfeuerwehr Rosenheim on 20 October 1860.

The football departments greatest success came in 2012, when it won the Bayernliga for the first time and earned promotion to the Regionalliga Bayern.

Apart from football, the club offers eleven different sports, from basketball to triathlon.

== History ==
=== From 1860 to 1914 ===
The history of TSV goes back to before 1860 when young men trained in gymnastics in the courtyard of Weinwirt Fortner, then a popular wine bar in Rosenheim. On 20 October 1860 the local gymnasts organized themselves as Freiwillige Turnerfeuerwehr Rosenheim, a sports association and volunteer fire brigade. In 1865, the club took up sports education at the local primary school until 1868 when the city of Rosenheim provided a designated area on the Kaiser-Ellmaierstraße for the club's gymnasts to train. In 1870, the club had 35 members, of whom 24 served in the Franco-Prussian War (1870–71). Four club members lost their lives in the conflict.

In 1873, the voluntary fire brigade and the gymnastics club split into two separate entities, with the gymnasts becoming the Turnverein Rosenheim. The 40 member strong club became a registered sporting association in 1893. In 1895, they purchased a property on Wittelsbacherstraße to build a sports hall and sports ground. By the turn of the century in 1900, TV Rosenheim had over 200 members.

=== From 1914 to 1945 ===
During World War I, club members again served in the armed forces with 40 of their number not returning from the battlefield. Despite these losses, the club formed a football department in 1919, with Georg Bayer as its first chairman. In these first years, the footballers moved home ground regularly until, in 1923, the ground at Jahnstraße became their permanent home.

Apart from the footballers, the club saw enlargement in many fields in those post-war years, forming a track & field and a swimming department as well.

In 1924, a separation of gymnastics and football clubs took place in across of Germany, as ordered by the Deutscher Turnerbund (German Gymnastics Federation). The footballers of the TVR became independent under the name of Spiel und Sportvereinigung Rosenheim. The TVR continued to grow and in 1933 the footballers re-joined their parent club. A new sports centrum was built, the Sportanlage an der Jahnstraße, at the footballers home ground. The new homeground was inaugurated in a match versus the club's name sake, TSV 1860 München, which ended in a surprising 4–3 victory for the locals in front of 3,000 spectators.

The Second World War again saw many of the club's members called to military service. Of the 170 that went, 60 did not return. The club suffered further when a 1944 air strike on Rosenheim virtually destroyed the sports ground and club house. Another air strike in April 1945 destroyed the tennis courts. Rosenheim was regarded as part of the Alpenfestung (Alpine Fortress) by the Allies and was also located on a major rail and road intersection.

=== After 1945 ===
The American occupation forces in Bavaria dissolved all sports clubs after the end of the war in 1945 and Rosenheim was no exception. A local sports club however quickly formed, uniting all of Rosenheims associations in the ASV Rosenheim in 1945. The ASV quickly initiated a rebuilding program and in 1946 and 1947 the sports grounds on Jahnstraße and the tennis grounds on Wittelsbacherstraße were rebuilt under the direction of August Rothmann and Hannes Heinritzi. The ASV spent two seasons in the Landesliga Bayern, then the second tier of the German league system. A second place in 1946–47 was followed by a ninth the season after and relegation due to the reduction of the number of Landesligas. The installations on Jahnstraße were finally reopened in 1948. With the liberalization of laws by the occupying forces, the ASV was permitted to return to its original name and the TSV 1860 Rosenheim was reborn in 1950.

The club formed a basketball department in 1960 and constructed a designated sports field for its players in the same year. Also, the club's home at Jahnstraße was overhauled that year. In the year of the one hundreds anniversary, the football department achieved its greatest success so far, promotion to the Amateurliga Bayern (III), the highest football league in the state. The club however only lasted one season in this league, finishing 14th and being relegated back to the 2nd Amateurliga. From 1963, the club spent most of its time in the Landesliga Bayern-Süd (IV), where it became something of a fixture, having spent more seasons on this level than any other club in any of the three Bavarian Landesligas. As of 2007, the club leads the all-time table for the Landesliga Süd by an incredible 400 points, ahead of second placed FC Gundelfingen.

The club itself meanwhile formed a bobsleigh department, reflecting the fact of Rosenheims geographical position between the lowlands and the mountains.

The club renovated its stadium and reopened it on 8 September 1969 with a game against FC Bayern Munich who just won its second German championship this year. By 1970, the club had almost 1200 members but the football department found itself dropping to the Bezirksliga for two seasons, returning to the Landesliga in 1972. A new club home was built in 1972 and the town also saw the Olympic flame carried through Rosenheim by the club's athletes for the 1972 Summer Olympics. Six members of the club took part in the 1976 Winter Olympics in Innsbruck, all in the bobsled competition. The 1980 Winter Olympics saw two members of the TSV compete.

In 1976, the TSV managed for a second time to win promotion to the Bayernliga, this time holding out for six seasons in the highest Bavarian league. A tenth place in 1979 remains the best ever result for the club. A grandstand was built on the northern side of the stadium in 1978, on the strength of Bayernliga membership.

In 1982, the football team was relegated back to the Landesliga. A year later, the under-19's side of the club gained promotion to the Bayernliga, competing with clubs like Bayern Munich and TSV 1860 München in this league. The club's basketball department achieved similar success in 1994, gaining entry in the Oberliga Bayern.

The year 1995 saw the third promotion of the club's senior football team to the Bayernliga. again, they only lasted one year, bounced back straight away to find themselves relegated from the league once more in 1998. Since then, the TSV 1860 has remained in its, almost, permanent home Landesliga. Relegation pain was eased by the fact that the team reached the second round of the German cup (DFB Pokal) in 1999–2000, going out to FC St. Pauli 1–2 at home, after the club won the Bavarian Cup and once more qualified for the national cup competition, financially a major success for a small amateur site like the TSV 1860.

In 1999, a merger with local rival SB/DJK Rosenheim was discussed but failed. Instead, the stadium at Jahnstraße was once more renovated and in 2001 an astro turf field was installed next to the ice hockey stadium.

In 2008–09, the club returned to more successful ways, earning promotion back to the Bayernliga after winning another Landesliga title. In 2011–12 the club took out its first-ever Bayernliga championship and earned promotion to the Regionalliga. In the 2012–13 the club finished on a mid-table spot in the league but won the Bavarian Cup for a second time in the club's history and qualified for the first round of the German Cup. The club finished 15th in the league in 2013–14 and had to defend its Regionalliga place in a play-off round with the Bayernliga runners-up where it survived the first round but was condemned to relegation by fellow Regionalliga club 1. FC Schweinfurt after two defeats.

TSV 1860 offers eleven different sports, as diverse as fencing and triathlon. The club is part of a youth development program with the FC Bayern Munich, one of eleven clubs to currently do so. Bastian Schweinsteiger is currently the most well known player from the club, playing for the English side Manchester United and as the German national team's captain. Schweinsteiger's transfer from Munich to Manchester earned the club a solidarity contribution of €38.000 from Manchester United.

A third-place finish in the Bayrnliga in 2015–16 qualified the club for the promotion round to the Regionalliga. A first-round defeat by FC Augsburg II was followed by victory over Viktoria Aschaffenburg and promotion back to the Regionalliga.

== Honours ==
The club's honours:

=== League ===
- Bayernliga
  - Champions: 2012
- Landesliga Bayern-Süd (IV-VI)
  - Champions: (4) 1976, 1995, 1997, 2009
  - Runners-up: 1966
- 2nd Amateurliga Oberbayern A (IV)
  - Champions: (2) 1960, 1963
- Bezirksliga Oberbayern-Ost (V)
  - Champions: 1972

=== Cup ===
- Bavarian Cup
  - Winners: 1999, 2013

=== Youth ===
- Bavarian Under 15 championship
  - Runners-up: 2003

== Recent managers ==
Recent managers of the club:

Manager	Start	Finish
Marco Schmidt	1 July 2012	9 June 2012
Dirk Teschke	9 June 2012	28 November 2013
Thomas Siegmund Patrik Peltram	20 December 2013	8 September 2014
Patrik Peltram	20 December 2013	5 November 2015
Robert Mayer	6 November 2015	17 December 2015
Klaus Seidel	18 December 2015	31 December 2016
Tobias Strobl	1 January 2017	30 June 2018
Ognjen Zaric	1 July 2018	31 January 2019
Thomas Kasparetti	1 February 2019	Present

== Recent seasons ==
The club's seasons since 1963:

Season	Division	Tier	Position
1963–64	Landesliga Bayern-Süd	IV	4th
1964–65	Landesliga Bayern-Süd	IV	3rd
1965–66	Landesliga Bayern-Süd	IV	2nd
1966–67	Landesliga Bayern-Süd	IV	10th
1967–68	Landesliga Bayern-Süd	IV	11th
1968–69	Landesliga Bayern-Süd	IV	11th
1969–70	Landesliga Bayern-Süd	IV	14th ↓
1970–71	Bezirksliga Oberbayern-Ost	V	
1971–72	Bezirksliga Oberbayern-Ost	V	1st ↑
1972–73	Landesliga Bayern-Süd	IV	8th
1973–74	Landesliga Bayern-Süd	IV	7th
1974–75	Landesliga Bayern-Süd	IV	13th
1975–76	Landesliga Bayern-Süd	IV	1st ↑
1976–77	Bayernliga	III	11th
1977–78	Bayernliga	III	12th
1978–79	Bayernliga	III	10th
1979–80	Bayernliga	III	13th
1980–81	Bayernliga	III	14th
1981–82	Bayernliga	III	16th ↓
1982–83	Landesliga Bayern-Süd	IV	7th
1983–84	Landesliga Bayern-Süd	IV	4th
1984–85	Landesliga Bayern-Süd	IV	3rd
1985–86	Landesliga Bayern-Süd	IV	13th
1986–87	Landesliga Bayern-Süd	IV	11th
1987–88	Landesliga Bayern-Süd	IV	10th
1988–89	Landesliga Bayern-Süd	IV	13th
1989–90	Landesliga Bayern-Süd	IV	7th
1990–91	Landesliga Bayern-Süd	IV	14th

Season	Division	Tier	Position
1991–92	Landesliga Bayern-Süd	IV	7th
1992–93	Landesliga Bayern-Süd	IV	8th
1993–94	Landesliga Bayern-Süd	IV	5th
1994–95	Landesliga Bayern-Süd	IV	1st ↑
1995–96	Bayernliga	III	16th ↓
1996–97	Landesliga Bayern-Süd	IV	1st ↑
1997–98	Bayernliga	III	17th ↓
1998–99	Landesliga Bayern-Süd	IV	7th
1999–2000	Landesliga Bayern-Süd	IV	12th
2000–01	Landesliga Bayern-Süd	IV	12th
2001–02	Landesliga Bayern-Süd	IV	6th
2002–03	Landesliga Bayern-Süd	IV	11th
2003–04	Landesliga Bayern-Süd	IV	13th
2004–05	Landesliga Bayern-Süd	IV	5th
2005–06	Landesliga Bayern-Süd	IV	3rd
2006–07	Landesliga Bayern-Süd	IV	11th
2007–08	Landesliga Bayern-Süd	IV	8th
2008–09	Landesliga Bayern-Süd	VI	1st ↑
2009–10	Bayernliga	V	12th
2010–11	Bayernliga	V	3rd
2011–12	Bayernliga	V	1st ↑
2012–13	Regionalliga Bayern	IV	7th
2013–14	Regionalliga Bayern	IV	15th ↓
2014–15	Bayernliga Süd	V	10th
2015–16	Bayernliga Süd	V	3rd ↑
2016–17	Regionalliga Bayern	IV	9th
2017–18	Regionalliga Bayern	IV	15th
2018–19	Regionalliga Bayern	IV	15th

- With the introduction of the Bezirksoberligas in 1988 as the new fifth tier, below the Landesligas, all leagues below dropped one tier. With the introduction of the Regionalligas in 1994 and the 3. Liga in 2008 as the new third tier, below the 2. Bundesliga, all leagues below dropped one tier. With the establishment of the Regionalliga Bayern as the new fourth tier in Bavaria in 2012 the Bayernliga was split into a northern and a southern division, the number of Landesligas expanded from three to five and the Bezirksoberligas abolished. All leagues from the Bezirksligas onwards were elevated one tier.

↑ Promoted	↓ Relegated

== Local rivals ==
There is currently eight different football clubs in Rosenheim, however, only one other than the TSV 1860 has competed on the highest Bavarian level, this being the SB/DJK Rosenheim, who played in the Bayernliga for one season in 1978–79, alongside the TSV. The two clubs have only played one season in the same league after that, 1982–83 in the Landesliga. After 24 years, the Sportbund returned to the Landesliga in 2007 and once more a derby was played. Both clubs lingered in mid table of the Landesliga all season, with no real promotion or relegation issues to worry about. The two games in the league against each other happened to be staged within five days in November 2007, each side winning their home game 2–1. In the final table of the Landesliga in 2007–08, the TSV finished one spot above the SB.

The league derbys between TSV and SB since 1971:

Season	League	Teams	Home	Away
1971–72	Bezirksliga	TSV 1860 Rosenheim – SB/DJK Rosenheim	3–0	3–0
1978–79	Bayernliga	TSV 1860 Rosenheim – SB/DJK Rosenheim	0–0	3–0
1982–83	Landesliga	TSV 1860 Rosenheim – SB/DJK Rosenheim	0–1	1–1
2007–08	Landesliga	TSV 1860 Rosenheim – SB/DJK Rosenheim	2–1	1–2
2008–09	Landesliga	TSV 1860 Rosenheim – SB/DJK Rosenheim	1–0	0–1
2011–12	Bayernliga	TSV 1860 Rosenheim – SB/DJK Rosenheim	3–3	0–3
2012–13	Bavarian Cup	SB/DJK Rosenheim – TSV 1860 Rosenheim	0–1	
2014–15	Bayernliga	TSV 1860 Rosenheim – SB/DJK Rosenheim	2–1	3–1

Source:"Tables and results of the Bavarian football leagues". Manfred Herzing. Archived from the original on 1 August 2015.

== Local competition ==
While the TSV 1860 overshadows the Sportbund in football, it in turn is no match to the other club's ice hockey department. Three German titles and three more lost final series are the SB's (which now stands for Star Bulls) record on national level. Like many of the small southern Bavarian towns, hockey far dominates football in popularity and success. the SB Rosenheim currently competes in the Oberliga Süd (III), having avoided relegation in the 2007–08 season and being a far cry from its former glory. In its better days in the 1980s, the club provided at times a third of the German national ice hockey team. Still, ice hockey attracts far more spectators, and passion, then football in Rosenheim.

== Current squad ==
As of 28 February 2021

Note: Flags indicate national team as defined under FIFA eligibility rules; some limited exceptions apply. Players may hold more than one non-FIFA nationality.

No.	Pos.	Nation	Player
1	GK	ROU	Alin Goia
6	MF	GER	Linor Shabani
7	FW	GER	Korbinian Linner
8	FW	GER	Sam Zander
10	DF	GER	Christoph Wallner
11	FW	SRB	Danijel Majdancevic
13	MF	GER	Yannick Albrich
14	FW	GER	Christoph Fenninger
16	DF	GER	Markus Sattelberger
17	DF	GER	Robert Köhler
18	MF	GER	Lucas Markert
19	MF	GER	Adel Merdan

No.	Pos.	Nation	Player
23	GK	GER	Niklas Pfister
24	DF	GER	Mathias Heiß
25	DF	GER	Julian Höllen
26	MF	GER	Louis Zimmerschied
28	FW	GER	Dominik Bacher
29	DF	GER	Daniel Knauff
32	MF	FRA	Alexis Fambo
36	MF	GER	Laurin Demolli
37	DF	AUT	Moritz Moser
41	GK	GER	Jakob Mayer
61	MF	GER	Tizian Zimmermann

== Club members at the Olympics ==
Six members of the club took part in the 1976 Winter Olympics in Innsbruck, those were:

- Georg Heibl, 2-men bobsled, finished 5th in the competition
- Fritz Ohlwärter, 2-men bobsled, finished 5th in the competition
- Richard Horner, 4-men bobsled, finished 5th in the competition
- Hans Morant, 4-men bobsled, finished 5th in the competition
- Hans Wagner, 4-men bobsled, finished 5th in the competition
- Siegi Radandt, 4-men bobsled, finished 5th in the competition

Two members of the club took part in the 1980 Winter Olympics in Lake Placid, those were:

- Hans Wagner, bobsled, finished 7th in the competition
- Walter Barfuß, 4-men bobsled, finished 7th in the competition

== DFB Cup appearances ==
The club has qualified for the first round of the German Cup twice, in 1999 when it received a bye and advanced to the second round and in 2013:

Season	Round	Date	Home	Away	Result	Attendance
1999–2000 DFB-Pokal	Second round	8 August 1999	TSV 1860 Rosenheim	FC St. Pauli	1–2	4,000
2013–14 DFB-Pokal	First round	2 August 2013	TSV 1860 Rosenheim	VfR Aalen	0–2	2,000

Source:"DFB-Pokal" (in German). Weltfussball.de.
