= SV Wacker Burghausen =

German association football club from Burghausen, Bavaria

- Full name: Sportverein Wacker Burghausen e. V.
- Founded: 1930
- Ground: Wacker-Arena
- Capacity: 10,000
- Chairman: Dr. Willi Kleine
- Manager: Matthias Ostrzolek
- League: Regionalliga Bayern (IV)
- 2025–26: Regionalliga Bayern, 9th of 18
Home colours	Away colours	Third colours

SV Wacker Burghausen is a German football club based in Burghausen, Bavaria and is part of one of the nation's largest sports clubs with some 6,000 members participating in two dozen different sports.

== History ==
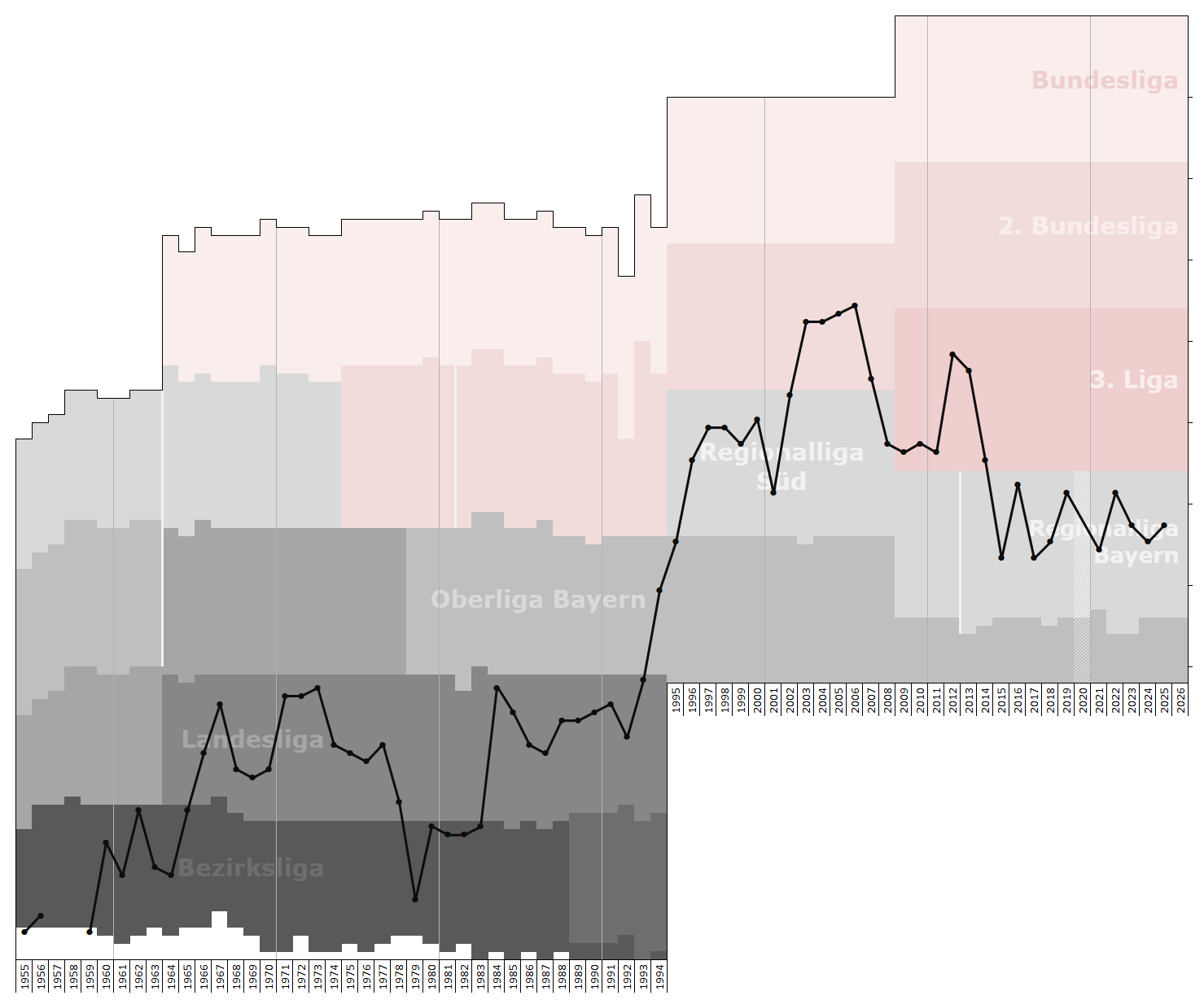
Historical chart of Wacker Burghausen league performance

The club was founded on 13 November 1930 and was made up largely of employees from the local chemical factory Wacker Chemie, which was established in 1914, and still sponsors the club today. The first football side in the city was part of the gymnastics club Turnverein Burghausen. In 1922, the footballers left TV to form 1. FC Burghausen which became part of SV at the time of its founding. Besides football, the new club had departments for shooting, athletics, and youth.

SV won the East Bavarian championship just three years later in 1933, but then afterwards toiled in anonymity in the local lower-level leagues until 1993 when they won the Landesliga Bayern-Süd (V) title, followed by the Bayernliga (IV) championship two years later, which advanced the club to the Regionalliga Süd (III). In 2002–03, the team played its way into the 2. Bundesliga where they competed until being relegated at the end of the 2006–07 campaign.

Wacker earned a seventh-place finish in the Regionalliga in 2007–08, which qualified the team for the new 3. Liga the following season. It finished the 2008–09 season in 18th place, on a relegation rank but was saved from having to step down to the Regionalliga by the withdrawal from the league of Kickers Emden for financial reasons.

The club finished in 18th place, on a relegation rank but was saved from having step down to the Regionalliga for a second time by the insolvency of Rot Weiss Ahlen. After good results in 2011–12 and 2012–13 the club finished 19th in the league in 2013–14 and was relegated to the Regionalliga Bayern.

=== Reserve team ===
The SV Wacker Burghausen II team played in the Bayernliga (IV) from 2005 to 2007, making Burghausen one of the few clubs to have had both first and second teams play at this level. The reserve team finished 15th in the Landesliga Bayern-Süd (VI) in the 2010–11 season, narrowly avoiding relegation. At the end of the 2011–12 season the team qualified directly for the newly expanded Bayernliga after winning the league championship in the Landesliga. It played in the Bayernliga until 2014 when the club decided to withdraw the team from competition at the end of the season.

== Honours ==
The club's honours:

=== League ===
- Regionalliga Süd (III)
  - Champions: 2002
- Bayernliga (IV)
  - Champions: 1995
- Landesliga Bayern-Süd (IV)
  - Champions: 1993
  - Runners-up: 1973, 1984
- 2. Amateurliga Oberbayern A (IV)
  - Champions: 1962
- Bezirksliga Oberbayern-Ost (V)
  - Champions: 1965, 1983

=== Cup ===
- Bavarian Cup
  - Runners-up: 2009, 2010, 2011, 2013, 2017

=== Reserve team ===
- Landesliga Bayern-Süd (V)
  - Champions: 2005, 2012
- Bezirksoberliga Oberbayern (VI)
  - Runners-up: 2001
- Bezirksliga Oberbayern-Ost (VII)
  - Runners-up: 1999

=== Youth ===
- Bavarian Under 19 championship
  - Champions: 2006, 2013
  - Runners-up: 2011
- Bavarian Under 17 championship
  - Champions: 2009
  - Runners-up: 2005

== Recent managers ==
Recent managers of the club:

Manager	Start	Finish
Rainer Hörgl	1 July 2000	25 October 2000
Rudi Bommer	26 October 2000	30 June 2004
Markus Schupp	1 July 2004	14 December 2006
Gino Lettieri	2 January 2007	30 June 2007
Ingo Anderbrügge	1 July 2007	31 March 2008
Peter Assion	1 April 2008	30 June 2008
Günter Güttler	1 July 2008	14 April 2009
Ralf Santelli	15 April 2009	30 June 2009
Jürgen Press	1 July 2009	9 August 2010
Mario Basler	11 August 2010	14 May 2011
Rudi Bommer	1 July 2011	31 December 2011
Reinhard Stumpf	5 January 2012	30 June 2012
Georgi Donkov	1 July 2012	5 September 2013
Uwe Wolf	13 September 2013	30 June 2014
Mario Demmelbauer	1 July 2014	11 November 2014
Uwe Wolf	12 November 2014	Present

== Recent seasons ==
The recent season-by-season performance of the club:

=== SV Wacker Burghausen ===
Year	Division	Tier	Position
1999–2000	Regionalliga Süd	III	4th
2000–01	Regionalliga Süd	III	13th
2001–02	Regionalliga Süd	III	1st ↑
2002–03	2. Bundesliga	II	10th
2003–04	2. Bundesliga	II	10th
2004–05	2. Bundesliga	II	9th
2005–06	2. Bundesliga	II	8th
2006–07	2. Bundesliga	II	17th ↓
2007–08	Regionalliga Süd	III	7th
2008–09	3. Liga	III	18th
2009–10	3. Liga	III	17th
2010–11	3. Liga	III	17th
2011–12	3. Liga	III	6th
2012–13	3. Liga	III	8th
2013–14	3. Liga	III	19th ↓
2014–15	Regionalliga Bayern	IV	11th
2015–16	Regionalliga Bayern	IV	2nd
2016–17	Regionalliga Bayern	IV	10th
2017–18	Regionalliga Bayern	IV	9th
2018–19	Regionalliga Bayern	IV	3rd
2019–21	Regionalliga Bayern	IV	11th
2021–22	Regionalliga Bayern	IV	3rd
2022–23	Regionalliga Bayern	IV	7th
2023–24	Regionalliga Bayern	IV	9th
2024–25	Regionalliga Bayern	IV	7th
2025–26	Regionalliga Bayern	IV	9th

=== SV Wacker Burghausen II ===
Year	Division	Tier	Position
1999–2000	Bezirksoberliga Oberbayern	VI	5th
2000–01	Bezirksoberliga Oberbayern	VI	2nd ↑
2001–02	Landesliga Bayern-Süd	V	13th
2002–03	Landesliga Bayern-Süd	V	10th
2003–04	Landesliga Bayern-Süd	V	3rd
2004–05	Landesliga Bayern-Süd	V	1st ↑
2005–06	Bayernliga	IV	13th
2006–07	Bayernliga	IV	18th ↓
2007–08	Landesliga Bayern-Süd	V	6th
2008–09	Landesliga Bayern-Süd	VI	5th
2009–10	Landesliga Bayern-Süd	VI	6th
2010–11	Landesliga Bayern-Süd	VI	15th
2011–12	Landesliga Bayern-Süd	VI	1st ↑
2012–13	Bayernliga-Süd	V	2nd
2013–14	Bayernliga Süd	V	15th
2015–present	Defunct		

- With the introduction of the Bezirksoberligas in 1988 as the new fifth tier, below the Landesligas, all leagues below dropped one tier. With the introduction of the Regionalligas in 1994 and the 3. Liga in 2008 as the new third tier, below the 2. Bundesliga, all leagues below dropped one tier.

=== Key ===
↑ Promoted	↓ Relegated

== Retired numbers ==
11 – (Slovakia) Marek Krejčí, Forward (2004–07) – posthumous honour.

== Current squad ==
As of 8 September 2026

Note: Flags indicate national team as defined under FIFA eligibility rules; some limited exceptions apply. Players may hold more than one non-FIFA nationality.

No.	Pos.	Nation	Player
1	GK	AUT	Markus Schöller
3	DF	GER	Benedikt Schwarzensteiner
4	DF	GER	Elias Crößmann
5	DF	GER	Rodriguez Fantozzi
6	MF	GER	Felix Bachschmid
7	MF	GER	Alexander Gordok
8	MF	GER	Noah Wagner
9	FW	GER	Marc Sodji
10	FW	GER	Noah Agbaje
13	DF	GER	Luca Lechner
14	MF	GER	Michael Dinkler
15	DF	GER	Konstantin Gertig
16	FW	CRO	Noa-Gabriel Šimić

No.	Pos.	Nation	Player
17	MF	GER	Moritz Bangerter
18	DF	GER	Adrian Hofherr
19	FW	FRA	Timothée Diowo
20	DF	GER	Luca Wagenspöck
21	DF	GER	Louis Stegmiller
22	GK	GER	Marcel Brinkmann
23	DF	GER	Jannis Turtschan
25	FW	GER	Noah Müller
26	FW	GER	Leopold Forstpointner
27	MF	GER	Moritz Leitner
30	GK	GER	Tom Kretzschmar
37	DF	GER	Maximilian Schuhbauer

=== Out on loan ===
Note: Flags indicate national team as defined under FIFA eligibility rules; some limited exceptions apply. Players may hold more than one non-FIFA nationality.

No.	Pos.	Nation	Player
—	MF	GER	Tobias Duxner (at SV Erlbach until 30 June 2027)
—	MF	GER	Jaroud Kanze (at FC Pipinsried until 30 June 2027)

No.	Pos.	Nation	Player
—	FW	GER	Sebastian Dengel (at SV Kirchanschöring until 30 June 2027)

== Other sports ==
The sports club's top wrestling team, is the champion of Bundesliga (wrestling), until Q1 2027.

Its wrestlers includes Batyrbek Tsakulov.
