= 2022–23 in Indian football =

Football in India
- Season: 2022–23

Men's football
- ISL: Shield: Mumbai City; Cup: ATK Mohun Bagan
- I-League: RoundGlass Punjab
- I-League 2nd Div.: Delhi
- Super Cup: Odisha
- Durand Cup: Bengaluru

Women's football
- IWL: Gokulam Kerala

The 2022–23 season was the 135th competitive association football season in India. The season began in August 2022 and ended in May 2023.

== Men's national football team ==
=== Senior team ===
==== 2023 AFC Asian Cup qualifiers ====
| Pos | Team | Pld | W | D | L | GF | GA | GD | Pts | Qualification | India | Hong Kong | Afghanistan | Cambodia |
|---|---|---|---|---|---|---|---|---|---|---|---|---|---|---|
| 1 | India (H) | 3 | 3 | 0 | 0 | 8 | 1 | +7 | 9 | 2023 AFC Asian Cup | — | 4–0 | — | 2–0 |
| 2 | Hong Kong | 3 | 2 | 0 | 1 | 5 | 5 | 0 | 6 | 2023 AFC Asian Cup | — | — | 2–1 | — |
| 3 | Afghanistan | 3 | 0 | 1 | 2 | 4 | 6 | −2 | 1 | | 1–2 | — | — | 2–2 |
| 4 | Cambodia | 3 | 0 | 1 | 2 | 2 | 7 | −5 | 1 | | — | 0–3 | — | — |

Source: AFC
(H) Hosts

| 8 June 2022 AFC AC Q | India | 2–0 | Cambodia | Kolkata, India |
| 20:30 UTC+5:30 | Chhetri 14' (pen.), 60' | Report | | Stadium: Salt Lake Stadium; Attendance: 26,118; Referee: Baraa Aisha (Palestine) |

| 11 June 2022 AFC AC Q | Afghanistan | 1–2 | India | Kolkata, India |
| 20:30 UTC+5:30 | Amiri 88' | Report | Chhetri 86'; Samad 90+1' | Stadium: Salt Lake Stadium; Attendance: 44,216; Referee: Razlan Joffri Ali (Malaysia) |

| 14 June 2022 AFC AC Q | India | 4–0 | Hong Kong | Kolkata, India |
| 20:30 UTC+5:30 | Anwar Ali 1'; Chhetri 45+1'; M. Singh 85'; Pandita 90+3' | Report | | Stadium: Salt Lake Stadium; Attendance: 48,216; Referee: Qasim Matar Ali Al-Hatmi (Oman) |

==== Friendlies ====
| 24 September 2022 VFF Tri-series | India | 1–1 | Singapore | Hồ Chí Minh City, Vietnam |
| 19:00 UTC+7 | Kuruniyan 43' | Report | Ikhsan 37' | Stadium: Thống Nhất Stadium; Referee: Hoàng Ngọc Hà (Vietnam) |

| 27 September 2022 VFF Tri-series | Vietnam | 3–0 | India | Hồ Chí Minh City, Vietnam |
| 19:00 UTC+7 | Phan Văn Đức 10'; Nguyễn Văn Toàn 49'; Nguyễn Văn Quyết 70' | Report | | Stadium: Thống Nhất Stadium; Referee: Clifford Daypuyat (Philippines) |

| 22 March 2023 2023 Tri-Nation Series | India | 1–0 | Myanmar | Imphal, India |
| 18:00 UTC+5:30 | Thapa 45+1' | Report | | Stadium: Khuman Lampak Main Stadium; Attendance: 29,431; Referee: Md Alamgir Sarker (Bangladesh) |

| 28 March 2023 2023 Tri-Nation Series | India | 2–0 | Kyrgyzstan | Imphal, India |
| 18:00 UTC+5:30 | Jhingan 34'; Chhetri 84' (pen.) | Report | | Stadium: Khuman Lampak Main Stadium; Attendance: 29,877; Referee: Md Alamgir Sarker (Bangladesh) |

=== Under-20 ===
==== SAFF U-20 Championship ====
| 27 July 2022 SAFF U-20 G.S | Bangladesh | 2–1 | India | Bhubaneswar, India |
| 16:00 UTC+05:30 | Nova 29' (45), pen.' | Report | Gurkirat 35' | Attendance: 500; Referee: Sinan Hussain (Maldives) |

| 29 July 2022 SAFF U-20 G.S | India | 4–0 | Sri Lanka | Bhubaneswar, India |
| 16:00 UTC+05:30 | Jangra 50'; Gogoi 69', 90+3'; Gurkirat 74' (pen.) | Report | | Attendance: 500; Referee: M. Nassir Uddin (Bangladesh) |

| 31 July 2022 SAFF U-20 G.S | Nepal | 0–8 | India | Bhubaneswar, India |
| 19:00 UTC+05:30 | | Report | Taison 32', 66'; Gogoi 50', 52'; Jangra 70'; Bag 78'; Gurkirat 89'; Paul 90+3' | Attendance: 500; Referee: W. Lakmal Weerakkody (Sri Lanka) |

| 2 August 2022 SAFF U-20 G.S | India | 1–0 | Maldives | Bhubaneswar, India |
| 19:00 UTC+05:30 | Gurkirat 89'; Gogoi (red card) | Report | | Attendance: 550; Referee: Prajwol Chhetri (Nepal) |

| 5 August 2022 SAFF U-20 Final | Bangladesh | 2–5 (a.e.t.) | India | Bhubaneswar, India |
| 19:00 UTC+05:30 | Howleder 45'; Mia 62' | Report | Gurkirat 2' (pen.), 60', 93', 99'; Jangra 92' | Attendance: 7642; Referee: Sinan Hussain (Maldives) |

==== AFC U-20 Asian Cup qualifiers ====
| 14 October 2023 AFC U-20 Q | Iraq | 4–2 | India | Kuwait City, Kuwait |
| 16:30 UTC+03:00 | Qasim 2'; Abdulkareem 51'; Sadeq 63'; Yumnam 73' (o.g.) | Report | G. Singh 22'; Tongbram 33' | Stadium: Ali Sabah Al-Salem Stadium; Attendance: 351; Referee: Tam Ping Wun (Hong Kong) |

| 16 October 2023 AFC U-20 Q | India | 1–4 | Australia | Kuwait City, Kuwait |
| 16:30 UTC+03:00 | G. Singh 62' | Report | Kuol 12'; Yumnam 32' (o.g.); Segecic 86'; Caputo 90+2' | Stadium: Ali Sabah Al-Salem Stadium; Attendance: 88; Referee: Ali Reda (Lebanon) |

| 18 October 2023 AFC U-20 Q | India | 2–1 | Kuwait | Kuwait City, Kuwait |
| 19:30 UTC+03:00 | T. Singh 8'; G. Singh 77' | Report | Al-Mehtab 73' | Stadium: Ali Sabah Al-Salem Stadium; Attendance: 376; Referee: Tam Ping Wun (Hong Kong) |

=== Under-17 ===
==== SAFF U-17 Championship ====
| 5 September 2022 2022 SAFF U-17 G.S. | Bhutan | 0–3 | India | Colombo, Sri Lanka |
| 15:30 UTC+05:30 | | Report | Gangte 9', 15'; Vanlalpeka 47' | Stadium: Colombo Racecourse; Attendance: 302; Referee: Athambawa Mohammed Jafran (Sri Lanka) |

| 9 September 2022 2022 SAFF U-17 G.S. | India | 1−3 | Nepal | Colombo, Sri Lanka |
| 15:30 UTC+05:30 | Meitei 17' | | Darlami 43'; Budathoki 47'; Bam 68' | Stadium: Colombo Racecourse |

| 12 September 2022 2022 SAFF U-17 S.F. | Bangladesh | 1−2 | India | Colombo, Sri Lanka |
| 15:30 UTC+05:30 | Mirajul 61' (pen.) | | Gangte 50', 58' | Stadium: Colombo Racecourse; Referee: Kabin Byanjankar (Nepal) |

| 14 September 2022 2022 SAFF U-17 Final | India | 4–0 | Nepal | Colombo, Sri Lanka |
| 19:00 UTC+05:30 | Boby 18'; Korou 30'; Guite 63'; Aman 90+4' | Report | | Stadium: Colombo Racecourse; Referee: Alamgir Sarker (Bangladesh) |

==== Friendlies ====
| 27 September 2022 Friendly | Oman | 1–3 | India | Muscat, Oman |
| | Alhaitham Alshukaili 88'; Tamim Alburaiki (red card) | Report | Gangte 10'; Thokchom 18'; Lalpekhlua 69' (pen.) |

==== AFC U-17 Asian Cup qualifiers ====
| 3 October 2022 2023 AFC U-17 ACQ | Maldives | 0–5 | India | Khobar, Saudi Arabia |
| | | Report | Guite 11'; Fanai 24'; Aman 59'; Boby 67'; Oinam 71' | Stadium: Prince Saud bin Jalawi Stadium |

| 5 October 2022 2023 AFC U-17 ACQ | India | 3–0 | Kuwait | Dammam, Saudi Arabia |
| | Gangte 16', 71'; Korou 66' | | | Stadium: Prince Saud bin Jalawi Stadium |

| 7 October 2022 2023 AFC U-17 ACQ | Myanmar | 1–4 | India | Dammam, Saudi Arabia |
| | Wai Htoo 60' | | Guite 27', 34'; Gangte 32' (pen.), 44' | Stadium: Prince Saud bin Jalawi Stadium |

| 9 October 2022 2023 AFC U-17 ACQ | India | 1–2 | Saudi Arabia | Dammam, Saudi Arabia |
| | Gangte 90+5' | | Haji 21' (pen.), 58' | Stadium: Prince Mohamed bin Fahd Stadium |

==== Friendlies ====
| 12 December 2022 Hybrid friendly | Bengaluru FC U-18 (India) | 1–1 | India | Ballari, India |
| | Molla 68' | AIFF | Gangte 58' | Stadium: Inspire Institute of Sport |

| 15 December 2022 Hybrid friendly | Bengaluru FC U-18 (India) | 2–4 | India | Ballari, India |
| | Venkatesh 52' (pen.), 62' (pen.) | AIFF | Gangte 36', 46'; Meitei 47'; Korou 87' | Stadium: Inspire Institute of Sport |

| 18 December 2022 Hybrid friendly | Bengaluru FC U-18 (India) | 1–5 | India | Ballari, India |
| | Dey 2' | AIFF | Panwar 14'; Shashwant 39', 47', 52'; Korou 70' | Stadium: Inspire Institute of Sport |

| 16 January 2023 International friendly | UAE U-20 | 1–0 | India | Dubai, United Arab Emirates |
| | Mohamed Ali Khaled 5' | | | Stadium: Theyab Awana Stadium |

| 22 January 2023 International friendly | India | 2–0 | Uzbekistan | Vasco da Gama, India |
| 15:30 UTC+5:30 | Guite 29'; Lalpekhlua 45+2' | Report | | Stadium: Tilak Maidan; Attendance: 100; Referee: Tejas Nagvengenkar (India) |

| 24 January 2023 International friendly | India | 0–3 | Uzbekistan | Vasco da Gama, India |
| 20:30 UTC+5:30 | | Report | Usmonjonov 54'; Abraev 67'; Turgunboev 74' | Stadium: Tilak Maidan; Attendance: 50; Referee: Tejas Nagvenkar (India) |

| 28 January 2023 Hybrid friendly | India | 2–2 | (India) Young Champs U-19 | Vasco da Gama, India |
| 16:30 UTC+5:30 |

| 25 February 2023 International friendly | Qatar | 3–1 | India | Doha, Qatar |
| 19:30 UTC+5:30 | Ethan depina 5'; Khalid Alshaaibi 61'; Mohamed Elsiddig 89' | Report | Sashwat Panwar 25' | Stadium: Aspire Academy |

| 28 February 2023 International friendly | Qatar | 0–3 | India | Doha, Qatar |
| | | | Ricky Meetei 10'; Shashwant Panwar 34'; Korou Singh Thangujam 90+2' | Stadium: Aspire Academy |

| 19 April 2023 Hybrid friendly | Atlético Madrid U-16 (Spain) | 1–4 | India | Madrid, Spain |
| 18:00 UTC+2 | G. Suarez 38' | | Korou 6'; Lalpekhlua 32'; Panwar 34'; Gogocha 89' |

| 25 April 2023 Hybrid friendly | CD Leganés U-18 (Spain) | 2–0 | India | Madrid, Spain |
| 20:30 IST | Priso 35', Gonzalo 68' | Report | | Stadium: Ciudad Wanda Deportivo, Otero de Herreros |

| 27 April 2023 Hybrid friendly | Atlético Madrid U-16 (Spain) | 1–2 | India | Madrid, Spain |
| 21:30 IST | Tallon 78' | Report | Gangte, Lalpekhlua | Stadium: Centro Deportivo Wanda Alcalá de Henares |

| 3 May 2023 Hybrid friendly | India | 3–3 | (Spain) Real Madrid U-17 (Juvenil C) | Madrid, Spain |
| 20:30 IST | Shashwat 38'; Ralte 49'; Gangte 90' | Report | Arevalo 37'; Sanchez 52', 69' | Stadium: Ciudad Deportiva del Real Madrid |

| 10 May 2023 Hybrid friendly | India | 1–3 | (Spain) Getafe CF U-18 | Madrid, Spain |
| | Korou Singh 12' | | Angel Blanco 24'; Luis Kawecki 26'; Pramveer 39', o.g.' | Stadium: Otero de Herreros, Segovia |

| 17 May 2023 Hybrid friendly | VfB Stuttgart U-19 (Germany) | 3–1 | India | Stuttgart, Germany |
| 22:00 UTC+5:30 | Koenig 22'; Kuranyi 34'; Barth 54' (pen.) | Report | Panwar 80' (pen.) | Stadium: Mercedes-Benz Arena |

| 20 May 2023 Hybrid friendly | SSV Reutlingen U-16 (Germany) | 1–6 | India | Reutlingen, Germany |
| 20:00 UTC+5:30 | Zalloumi 34' | Report | Rohen 24'; Panwar 37'; Tangvah 52'; Chungkham 75'; Dodum 86'; Gangte 87' (pen.) |

| 26 May 2023 Hybrid friendly | FC Augsburg U-17 (Germany) | 1–3 | India | Augsburg, Germany |
| 20:30 UTC+5:30 | Heinze 33' (pen.) | Report | Meetei 13'; Guite 54'; Korou 56' | Stadium: Paul Renz Akademie |

| 29 May 2023 Hybrid Friendly | TSV Schwaben Augsburg U-17/U-18 (Germany) | 0–4 | India | Augsburg, Germany |
| 14:30 UTC+5:30 | | Report | Tangvah 16', 37'; Rohen 22'; Gangte 55' | Stadium: Paul Renz Akademie |

== Women's national football team ==
=== Senior team ===
==== Friendlies ====
‡ unofficial matches

| 22 June U-23 Tri-nation series‡ | Sweden U23 | 1–0 | India | Ängelholm, Sweden |
| 22:30 UTC+2 | Vickius 90+8' | Report | | Stadium: Ängelholms IP |

| 25 June U-23 Tri-nation series‡ | United States U23 | 4–1 | India | Helsingborg, Sweden |
| 22:30 UTC+2 | Bright 9'; Nighswonger 47'; Enge 74'; Cook 85' | Report | Xaxa 8' | Stadium: Laröds IP |

==== SAFF Women's Championship ====
| 7 September 2022 SAFF W GS | India | 3–0 | Pakistan | Kathmandu, Nepal |
| 13:00 | Maria 21' (o.g.); Grace 23'; Soumya 90+4' | Report | | Stadium: Dashrath Stadium; Attendance: 250; Referee: Yapa Y.A. Pabasara Minisarani (Sri Lanka) |

| 10 September 2022 SAFF W GS | Maldives | 0–9 | India | Kathmandu, Nepal |
| 17:30 | | Report | Tamang 24', 45+2', 85', 88'; Priyangka 42'; Grace 53', 86'; Guguloth 55'; Kashmina 84' | Stadium: Dashrath Stadium; Attendance: 180; Referee: Anjana Rai (Nepal) |

| 13 September 2022 SAFF W GS | India | 0–3 | Bangladesh | Kathmandu, Nepal |
| 17:30 | | Report | Shopna 12', 52'; Sarkar 22' | Stadium: Dashrath Stadium; Attendance: 279; Referee: Choki Om (Bhutan) |

| 16 September 2022 SAFF W SF | Nepal | 1−0 | India | Kathmandu, Nepal |
| 17:30 | Rashmi 45+1' | Report | | Stadium: Dashrath Stadium; Attendance: 7253; Referee: Choki Om (Bhutan) |

==== Friendlies ====
| 28 January Hybrid friendly | India U-20 | 1–2 | India | Chennai, India |
| | Apurna Narzary | Report | Dangmei; Roja | Stadium: SSN Ground |

| 15 February Friendly | India | 2–2 | Nepal | Chennai, India |
| 19:30 UTC+5:30 | Guguloth 56'; Indumathi 68' | Report | Bhandari 90' (pen.), 90+2' | Stadium: Jawaharlal Nehru Stadium; Referee: Alamgir Sarker (Bangladesh) |

| 18 February Friendly | India | 0–0 | Nepal | Chennai, India |
| 19:30 UTC+5:30 | | Report | | Stadium: Jawaharlal Nehru Stadium; Referee: Alamgir Sarker (Bangladesh) |

| 19 March Friendly | Jordan | 2–1 | India | Amman, Jordan |
| 18:30 UTC+5:30 | Jbarah 8'; Al-Jamaeen 12' | Report | Renu 74' | Stadium: Petra Stadium |

| 22 March Friendly | Jordan | 0–0 | India | Amman, Jordan |
| 18:30 UTC+5:30 | | Report | | Stadium: Petra Stadium |

| 28 March Friendly | Uzbekistan | 3–2 | India | Tashkent, Uzbekistan |
| 17:30 UTC+5:30 | Khabibullaeva 7'; Karachik 23'; Zaripova 90+2' | Report | Dangmei 22'; Indumathi 61' | Stadium: Pakhtakor Central Stadium |

==== Olympic qualifiers ====
| 4 April 2023 2024 Olympic Qualifiers Round 1 | Kyrgyzstan | 0–5 | India | Bishkek, Kyrgyzstan |
| 20:00 UTC+6 | | Report | Tamang 6', 42'; Guguloth 45+3'; Shilky Devi 61'; Renu 63' | Stadium: Dolen Omurzakov Stadium; Attendance: 354; Referee: Pansa Chaisanit (Thailand) |

| 7 April 2023 2024 Olympic Qualifiers Round 1 | India | 4–0 | Kyrgyzstan | Bishkek, Kyrgyzstan |
| 20:00 UTC+6 | Sandhiya 18', 56'; Tamang 24'; Renu 85' | Report | | Stadium: Dolen Omurzakov Stadium; Referee: Kim Yu-jeong (South Korea) |

=== Under-20 ===
==== Friendlies ====
| 28 January 2023 Hybrid friendly | India | 1–2 | India senior | Chennai, India |
| | Apurna Narzary | Report | Dangmei; Roja | Stadium: SSN Ground |

==== SAFF U-20 Women's Championship ====
| 3 February 2023 SAFF U-20 GS | India | 12–0 | Bhutan | Dhaka, Bangladesh |
| 15:00 UTC+6:00 | Apurna Narzary 29', 36'; N. Linda 43'; Neha 45+2', 55', 90'; Anita 50', 69', 78'; Kom Serto 61', 63', 75' | Report | | Stadium: BSSS M. Kamal Stadium; Attendance: 204; Referee: Jaya Chakma (Bangladesh) |

| 5 February 2023 SAFF U-20 GS | Bangladesh | 0–0 | India | Dhaka, Bangladesh |
| 19:00 UTC+6:00 | | Report | | Stadium: BSSS M. Kamal Stadium; Attendance: 4,156; Referee: Maya Lama (Nepal) |

| 7 February 2023 SAFF U-20 GS | India | 1–3 | Nepal | Dhaka, Bangladesh |
| 15:00 UTC+6:00 | Apurna 21' | Report | Anjali 48'; Preeti 69'; Amisha 89' | Stadium: BSSS M. Kamal Stadium; Attendance: 150; Referee: Yangkhey Tshering (Bhutan) |

==== AFC U-20 Women's Asian Cup qualifiers ====
| 7 March 2023 AFC U-20 Q 1R | India | 7–0 | Singapore | Việt Trì, Vietnam |
| 15:00 UTC+7 | Narzary 7', 11'; S. Kumari 10'; A. Kumari 17', 31'; Oraon 23'; D'Souza 89' | Report | | Stadium: Việt Trì Stadium; Attendance: 3,568; Referee: Mahnaz Zokaee (Iran) |

| 9 March 2023 AFC U-20 Q 1R | Indonesia | 0–6 | India | Việt Trì, Vietnam |
| 15:00 UTC+7 | | | 4', 22' Neha; 45' D'Souza; 56' Narzary; 74', 90+1' S. Kumari | Stadium: Việt Trì Stadium; Attendance: 6,238; Referee: Anjana Rai (Nepal) |

| 11 March 2023 AFC U-20 Q 1R | Vietnam | 1–1 | India | Việt Trì Stadium, Việt Trì |
| 18:00 UTC+7 | Trần Nhật Lan 45+2' | Report | B. Devi 12' | Attendance: 7,289; Referee: Kim Yu-jeong (South Korea) |

=== Under-17 ===
==== Friendlies ====
| 22 June 2022 6th Torneo FF | Italy | 7–0 | India | Gradisca d'Isonzo, Friuli-Venezia Giulia, Italy |
| 22:00 IST | Maria Vittoria Rossi 12'; Anna Longobardi 31'; Giulia Dragoni 33'; Manuela Sciabica 53'; Marta Zamboni 57', 72'; Sifia Di Benedetto 59' | Report | | Stadium: Gradisca d'Isonzo Stadium |

| 24 June 2022 6th Torneo FF | Chile | 3–1 | India | Savogna d'Isonzo, Friuli-Venezia Giulia, Italy |
| IST | Katerine Cubillos Ramos 11'; Maitte Tapia Maura 19'; Ambar Figueroa Rollino 67' | Report | Kajol Dsouza 55' | Stadium: Savogna d'Isonzo Stadium |

| 26 June 2022 6th Torneo FF | Mexico | 2–0 | India | Villesse, Friuli-Venezia Giulia, Italy |
| IST | Katherin Sillas 13'; Alice Gallegos 80+3' | Report | | Stadium: Villesse Stadium |

| 1 July 2022 Open Nordic U16 | Netherlands | 5–1 | India | Strømmen, Norway |
| 18:30 IST | Ilayah Dostmohamed 5'; Eva Elberink 8'; Veerle Buurman 33', 52' (pen.); Mirte Koppen 67' | Report | Neha 12' | Stadium: Strømmen Stadion |

| 4 July 2022 Open Nordic U16 | India | 0–3 | Iceland | Jessheim, Norway |
| 15:30 IST | | Report | Lilja Bjørk Unnarsdottir 43'; Emilia Oskarsdottir 62', 80' | Stadium: Jessheim Stadion |

| 7 July 2022 Open Nordic U16 | India | 0–0 (2−4 p) | Faroe Islands | Strømmen, Norway |
| 14:30 IST | | Report | | Stadium: Strømmen Stadion |

| 26 September 2022 Friendly | Sweden | 3−1 | India | Girona, Spain |
| | Ida Gramfors 44'; Sara Frigren 52'; Selma Astrom 54' | Report | Sudha Tirkey 62' | Stadium: Torremirona Relais |

| 30 September 2022 Friendly | Andorra | Cancelled | India | Andorra la Vella, Andorra |
| | | Report | | Stadium: Estadi Nacional |

| 2 October 2022 Hybrid Friendly | WSS Barcelona (Spain) | 1–17 | India | Barcelona, Spain |
| | Aya 54' | Report | Anita Kumari 3', 11', 13', 16', 20', 28'; Neha 5', 22'; S Lynda Kom 7', 15', 38'; Nitu Linda 7', 12', 34'; Lavanya Upadhyay 56'; Laishram Rejiya Devi 58'; Sudha Anita Tirkey 80' | Stadium: Soccerland Barcelona |

==== FIFA U-17 Women's World Cup ====
| 11 October 2022 FIFA U-17 Women's World Cup GS | India | 0–8 | United States | Bhubaneswar, India |
| 20:00 IST (UTC+5:30) | | Report (FIFA) | Rebimbas 9', 31'; Kohler 15'; Gamero 23'; Thompson 39'; Emri 51'; Suarez 59' (pen.); Bhuta 62' | Stadium: Kalinga Stadium; Attendance: 4,100; Referee: Susana Corella (Ecuador) |

| 14 October 2022 FIFA U-17 Women's World Cup GS | India | 0–3 | Morocco | Bhubaneswar, India |
| 20:00 IST (UTC+5:30) | | Report (FIFA) | El-Madani 51' (pen.); Zouhir 62'; Cherif 90+1' | Stadium: Kalinga Stadium; Attendance: 8,749; Referee: Katia García (Mexico) |

| 17 October 2022 FIFA U-17 Women's World Cup GS | Brazil | 5–0 | India | Bhubaneswar, India |
| 20:00 IST (UTC+5:30) | Berchon 11'; Aline 40', 51'; Lara 86', 90+3' | Report (FIFA) | | Stadium: Kalinga Stadium; Attendance: 8,765; Referee: Myriam Marcotte (Canada) |

==== SAFF U-17 Women's Championship ====
| 20 March 2023 SAFF U-17 GS | Nepal | 1–4 | India | Dhaka, Bangladesh |
| 15:15 UTC+6 | Barsha Oli 54' | Report (SAFF); Report (AIFF) | Shaji 10', 40', 81'; Pooja 41' | Stadium: BSSS Mostafa Kamal Stadium; Attendance: 203; Referee: Yangkhey Tshering (Bhutan) |

| 24 March 2023 SAFF U-17 GS | India | 0–1 | Bangladesh | Dhaka, Bangladesh |
| 19:15 UTC+6 | | | Akhila 74' (o.g.) | Stadium: BSSS Mostafa Kamal Stadium |

| 26 March 2023 SAFF U-17 GS | India | 9–0 | Bhutan | Dhaka, Bangladesh |
| 15:15 UTC+6 | Menaka 3'; Shaji 12', 62', 69', 76', 79'; Sibani 42', 61'; Thoibisana 56' | | | Stadium: BSSS Mostafa Kamal Stadium |

| 28 March 2023 SAFF U-17 GS | Russia | 2-0 | India | Dhaka, Bangladesh |
| 15:15 UTC+6 | Vasilisa Avdienko 10'; Daria Kotlova 13' | | | Stadium: BSSS Mostafa Kamal Stadium |

==== Friendlies ====
| 6 February 2023 Friendly | Jordan | 0–7 | India | Zarqa, Jordan |
| 13:00 (UTC+3:00) | | AIFF AIFF (Twitter) | Shaji 2', 37', 74', 76'; Manisha 13'; Pooja 18'; Sanjana 90+1' | Stadium: Prince Mohammed Stadium |

| 9 February 2023 Friendly | Jordan | 0–6 | India | Zarqa, Jordan |
| 13:00 (UTC+3:00) | | AIFF (Twitter) | Mera Atari 16' (o.g.); Shaji 24', 77', 82', 90+3'; Pooja 73' | Stadium: Prince Mohammed Stadium |

==== AFC U-17 Women's Asian Cup qualifiers Round 1 ====
| 26 April 2023 AFC U-17 Q 1R | India | 1–0 | Kyrgyzstan | Bishkek, Kyrgyzstan |
| IST | Sibani Devi 77' | Report | | Stadium: Dolen Omurzakov Stadium |

| 28 April 2023 AFC U-17 Q 1R | Myanmar | 1–2 | India | Bishkek, Kyrgyzstan |
| 20:00 UTC+6 | Ya Min Phyu 75' | | Sulanjana 26'; Pooja 33' | Stadium: Dolen Omurzakov Stadium |

== International competitions ==
=== Next Gen Cup Midlands (Group A) ===
Semifinals
1 | (England) Leicester City | 6
2 | (India) Bengaluru | 3
3 | (England) Nottingham Forest | 1
4 | (South Africa) Stellenbosch FC | 4

Final
1 | (England) Leicester City | 2
4 | (South Africa) Stellenbosch FC | 7
Third place
2 | (India) Bengaluru | 1
3 | (England) Nottingham Forest | 6

=== Next Gen Cup London (Group B) ===
Semifinals
1 | (England) Tottenham Hotspur | 7
2 | (India) Kerala Blasters | 0
3 | (England) Crystal Palace | 3
4 | (England) West Ham United | 4

Final
1 | (England) Tottenham Hotspur | 0
4 | (England) West Ham United | 8
Third place
2 | (India) Kerala Blasters | 1
3 | (England) Crystal Palace | 4

== AFC competitions ==
=== 2022 AFC Cup ===
==== Inter-zone play-off semi-finals ====
| 7 September 2022 | ATK Mohun Bagan (India) | 1–3 | (Malaysia) Kuala Lumpur City | Vivekananda Yuba Bharati Krirangan, Kolkata |
| 19:00 UTC+5:30 | Fardin Ali Molla 90' | Report | Josué 60'; Fakrul 90+2'; Morales 90+5' | Attendance: 18,594; Referee: Khalid Al-Turais (Saudi Arabia) |

== Men's club football ==
=== Indian Super League ===
==== Regular season ====
| Pos | Team | Pld | W | D | L | GF | GA | GD | Pts | Qualification |
|---|---|---|---|---|---|---|---|---|---|---|
| 1 | Mumbai City (C) | 20 | 14 | 4 | 2 | 54 | 21 | +33 | 46 | ISL Cup Semi-finals, Playoffs for 2023–24 ACL group stage and 2023–24 ACL group stage (Note: Qualified via winning the Indian club qualifiers for 2023–24 AFC competitions) (Note: It was announced by AIFF that 2022-23 will be the last season in which the defending Cup Winners will wear the Champions badge. Starting from 2023-24 season it will be the defending League Shield Winners that will wear the Champions badge hereafter.) |
| 2 | Hyderabad | 20 | 13 | 3 | 4 | 36 | 16 | +20 | 42 | ISL Cup Semi-finals |
| 3 | ATK Mohun Bagan (W) | 20 | 10 | 4 | 6 | 24 | 17 | +7 | 34 (Note: Head-to-head points: ATK Mohun Bagan 3, Bengaluru 3. Head-to-head goal difference: ATK Mohun Bagan 0, Bengaluru 0. Head-to-head goal scored: ATK Mohun Bagan 4, Bengaluru 4. Goal difference: ATK Mohun Bagan +7, Bengaluru +4.) | ISL Cup Knockouts, Playoffs for 2023–24 AFC Cup qualifiers (Note: Qualified via winning the 2023 Indian Super League playoffs) and 2023–24 AFC Cup qualifiers (Note: Qualified via winning the Indian club qualifiers for 2023–24 AFC competitions) (Note: It was announced by AIFF that 2022-23 will be the last season in which the reigning Cup Winners will wear the Champions badge. Starting from 2023-24 season it will be the reigning League Shield Winners that will wear the Champions badge thereafter.) |
| 4 | Bengaluru | 20 | 11 | 1 | 8 | 27 | 23 | +4 | 34 | ISL Cup Knockouts |
| 5 | Kerala Blasters | 20 | 10 | 1 | 9 | 28 | 28 | 0 | 31 | ISL Cup Knockouts |
| 6 | Odisha | 20 | 9 | 3 | 8 | 30 | 32 | −2 | 30 | ISL Cup Knockouts, Playoffs for 2023–24 AFC Cup group stage (Note: Qualified via winning the 2023 Super Cup) and 2023–24 AFC Cup group stage (Note: Qualified via winning the Indian club qualifiers for 2023–24 AFC competitions) |
| 7 | Goa | 20 | 8 | 3 | 9 | 36 | 35 | +1 | 27 (Note: Head-to-head points: Goa 3, Chennaiyin 3. Head-to-head goal difference: Goa +1, Chennaiyin -1.) | |
| 8 | Chennaiyin | 20 | 7 | 6 | 7 | 36 | 37 | −1 | 27 | |
| 9 | East Bengal | 20 | 6 | 1 | 13 | 22 | 38 | −16 | 19 (Note: Head-to-head points: East Bengal 3, Jamshedpur 3. Head-to-head goal difference: East Bengal +1, Jamshedpur -1.) | |
| 10 | Jamshedpur | 20 | 5 | 4 | 11 | 21 | 32 | −11 | 19 | |
| 11 | NorthEast United | 20 | 1 | 2 | 17 | 20 | 55 | −35 | 5 | |

Source: Indian Super League
Rules for classification: 1) points; 2) head-to-head points; 3) head-to-head goal difference; 4) head-to-head goals scored; 5) goal difference; 6) number of goals scored; 7) fair play ranking; 8) drawing of lots
(C) Champions; (W) ISL Cup winners

==== Playoffs ====
Knockout
4 | Bengaluru (a.e.t.) | 1
5 | Kerala Blasters | 0
3 | ATK Mohun Bagan | 2
6 | Odisha | 0

Semifinals
1 | Mumbai City | 0 | 2 | 2 (8)
4 | Bengaluru (p) | 1 | 1 | 2 (9)
2 | Hyderabad | 0 | 0 | 0 (3)
3 | ATK Mohun Bagan (p) | 0 | 0 | 0 (4)

Finals
4 | Bengaluru | 2 (3)
3 | ATK Mohun Bagan (p) | 2 (4)

=== I-League ===
| Pos | Team | Pld | W | D | L | GF | GA | GD | Pts | Qualification |
|---|---|---|---|---|---|---|---|---|---|---|
| 1 | RoundGlass Punjab (C, P) | 22 | 16 | 4 | 2 | 45 | 16 | +29 | 52 | Champions, Promotion to 2023–24 Indian Super League |
| 2 | Sreenidi Deccan | 22 | 13 | 3 | 6 | 44 | 29 | +15 | 42 | |
| 3 | Gokulam Kerala | 22 | 12 | 3 | 7 | 26 | 14 | +12 | 39 | |
| 4 | TRAU | 22 | 11 | 2 | 9 | 34 | 34 | 0 | 35 | |
| 5 | Real Kashmir | 22 | 9 | 7 | 6 | 27 | 25 | +2 | 34 | |
| 6 | Churchill Brothers | 22 | 9 | 6 | 7 | 34 | 24 | +10 | 33 | |
| 7 | Aizawl | 22 | 6 | 8 | 8 | 27 | 29 | −2 | 26 (Note: Head-to-head points: Aizawl 4, Mohammedan 1.) | |
| 8 | Mohammedan | 22 | 7 | 5 | 10 | 34 | 35 | −1 | 26 | |
| 9 | Rajasthan United | 22 | 7 | 4 | 11 | 19 | 32 | −13 | 25 (Note: Head-to-head points: Rajasthan United 6, NEROCA 0.) | |
| 10 | NEROCA | 22 | 7 | 4 | 11 | 22 | 26 | −4 | 25 | |
| 11 | Kenkre (R) | 22 | 3 | 8 | 11 | 23 | 40 | −17 | 17 | Relegation to 2023–24 I-League 2 |
| 12 | Sudeva Delhi (R) | 22 | 3 | 4 | 15 | 25 | 56 | −31 | 13 | Relegation to 2023–24 I-League 2 |

Source: I-League
Rules for classification: 1) points; 2) head-to-head points; 3) head-to-head goal difference; 4) goal difference; 5) number of goals scored; 6) drawing of lots
(C) Champions; (P) Promoted; (R) Relegated

=== I-League 2nd Division ===
==== Final round ====
| Pos | Team | Pld | W | D | L | GF | GA | GD | Pts | Qualification |
|---|---|---|---|---|---|---|---|---|---|---|
| 1 | Delhi | 4 | 2 | 1 | 1 | 6 | 4 | +2 | 7 | Champions and Promotion to 2023–24 I-League |
| 2 | Shillong Lajong | 4 | 2 | 1 | 1 | 5 | 7 | −2 | 7 | Promotion to 2023–24 I-League |
| 3 | Ambernath United Atlanta | 4 | 2 | 0 | 2 | 10 | 8 | +2 | 6 | 2023–24 I-League 2 |
| 4 | Bengaluru United | 4 | 2 | 0 | 2 | 3 | 3 | 0 | 6 | 2023–24 I-League 2 |
| 5 | United | 4 | 1 | 0 | 3 | 7 | 9 | −2 | 3 | 2023–24 I-League 2 |

Source: AIFF
Rules for classification: 1) points; 2) head-to-head points; 3) head-to-head goal difference; 4) head-to-head goals scored; 5) goal difference; 6) number of goals scored; 7) fair play ranking; 8) drawing of lots

=== Durand Cup ===
Quarterfinals
Mohammedan | 3
Kerala Blasters | 0
Mumbai City (a.e.t.) | 5
Chennaiyin | 3
Odisha | 1
Bengaluru (a.e.t.) | 2
Hyderabad | 3
Rajasthan United | 1

Semifinals
Mohammedan | 0
Mumbai City | 1
Bengaluru | 1
Hyderabad | 0

Final
Mumbai City | 1
Bengaluru | 2

==== Final ====
18 September 2022
18.00 IST

| Mumbai City | 1–2 | Bengaluru |
|---|---|---|
| Apuia 30' | Report | Narayanan 10'; Costa 61' |

Vivekananda Yuba Bharati Krirangan, Kolkata
Referee: C R Srikrishna

=== Super Cup ===
Semifinals
A1 | Bengaluru | 2
C1 | Jamshedpur | 0
B1 | Odisha | 3
D1 | NorthEast United | 1

Final
A1 | Bengaluru | 1
B1 | Odisha | 2

==== Final ====
25 April 2023
19:00 IST

| Bengaluru | 1–2 | Odisha |
|---|---|---|
| Chhetri 85' (pen.) | Report | Maurício 23', 38' |

EMS Stadium, Kozhikode
Attendance: 6,952
Referee: Rahul Kumar Gupta

=== Additional play-offs for AFC qualifications ===
AFC Champions League group stage
| Team 1 | Score | Team 2 |
|---|---|---|
| Jamshedpur | 1–3 | Mumbai City |

AFC Cup group stage
| Team 1 | Score | Team 2 |
|---|---|---|
| Gokulam Kerala | 1–3 | Odisha |

AFC Cup qualifying playoff
| Team 1 | Score | Team 2 |
|---|---|---|
| Hyderabad | 1–1; 1–3 (1–3 p) | ATK Mohun Bagan |

=== State football leagues ===
| Zone | State | League | Total teams | Champions | Runners-up | I-League 3 qualification |
|---|---|---|---|---|---|---|
| North | Delhi | Delhi Premier League | 10 | Vatika | Delhi | Vatika FC; Garhwal |
| North | Punjab | Punjab State Super Football League | 11 | RoundGlass Punjab | Punjab Police | International FC; Doaba United |
| North | Rajasthan | Rajasthan State Men's League | 9 | Jaipur Elite | Jaipur United | Jaipur Elite |
North-East
| North-East | Manipur | Manipur State League | 17 | KLASA | Rising Athletic Union | KLASA; KIYC |
| North-East | Meghalaya | Meghalaya State League | 25 | Rangdajied | Khliehmawlieh YC | Rangdajied |
| North-East | Mizoram | Mizoram Premier League | 8 | Chawnpui FC | FC Venghnuai | - |
| North-East | Sikkim | Sikkim Premier Division League | 8 | Sikkim Police FC | Sikkim Himalayan | - |
| North-East | Tripura | Chandra Memorial League | N/A | Forward Club Agartala | N/A | - |
East
| East | Jharkhand (Jamshedpur) | JSA League Premier Division | 11 | Jamshedpur B | Tata Steel | - |
| East | Odisha | FAO League | 8 | Sunrise Club | Radha Raman Club | Sports Odisha |
| East | West Bengal (Kolkata) | Calcutta Premier Division | 14 | Mohammedan | Bhawanipore | Bhawanipore; Diamond Harbour |
| East | Chhattisgarh | Chhattisgarh State Men's Football League | 9 | RKM FA | New Friends Dantewada | RKM FA; New Friends Dantewada |
| West | Goa | Goa Professional League | 11 | Dempo | Sporting Goa | Dempo; Sporting Goa |
| West | Gujarat | Gujarat SFA Club Championship | 17 | Baroda FA | ARA | Baroda FA; ARA |
| West | Madhya Pradesh | Madhya Pradesh Premier League | 8 | Lake City | Diamond Rock FA | Lake City |
| West | Maharashtra (Mumbai) | MFA Elite Division | 16 | Ambernath United Atlanta | Karnatak SA | Millat |
| South | Karnataka (Bengaluru) | Bangalore Super Division | 20 | SC Bengaluru | FC Bengaluru United | SC Bengaluru; Kickstart |
| South | Kerala | Kerala Premier League | 22 | Kerala United | Gokulam Kerala B | Kerala United |

== Women's club football ==
=== Indian Women's League ===
==== Knockout stage ====
Quarter-finals
B2 | Kickstart | 2
A4 | HOPS | 1
B1 | Sethu | 9
A3 | East Bengal | 0
A2 | Sports Odisha | 1 (2)
B4 | Eastern Sporting Union | 1 (4)
A1 | Gokulam Kerala | 1 (3)
B3 | Odisha | 1 (0)

Semi-finals
QF1 | Kickstart | 2
QF3 | Sethu | 0
QF2 | Eastern Sporting Union | 1
QF4 | Gokulam Kerala | 5

Final
SF1 | Kickstart | 0
SF2 | Gokulam Kerala | 5

==== Final ====
| 21 May 2023 | Kickstart | 0–5 | Gokulam Kerala | Ahmedabad |
| 18:00 UTC+5:30 | | Report | Bhandari 5'; Sandhiya 22', 52'; Indumathi 37' (pen.); Roja Devi 80' | Stadium: Transstadia; Attendance: 400; Referee: Kanika Barman; Player of the Match: Sabitra Bhandari (Gokulam Kerala) |

== Youth football ==
=== Elite League ===
==== Knockout stage ====
Round of 16
23 January – Deccan Arena, Hyderabad
Gandhinagar FC | 1
Techtro Swades United | 0
23 January – Deccan Arena, Hyderabad
Himalayan Kinnaur | 2
Rajasthan United | 1
23 January – Deccan Arena, Hyderabad
KR Football Leaders | 2
Punjab FA | 3
23 January – Deccan Arena, Hyderabad
Classic FA | 1
Minerva Academy FC | 0
24 January – Deccan Arena, Hyderabad
Sreenidi Deccan | 0
Sudeva Delhi | 2
24 January – Deccan Arena, Hyderabad
Corbett | 0
Zinc FA | 2
24 January – Deccan Arena, Hyderabad
Chennaiyin | 2 (9)
Garhwal FC | 2 (8)
24 January – Deccan Arena, Hyderabad
Odisha | 1 (5)
Muthoot FA | 1 (6)

Quarter-finals
25 January – Deccan Arena, Hyderabad
Gandhinagar FC | 1 (4)
Himalayan Kinnaur | 1 (5)
25 January – Deccan Arena, Hyderabad
Punjab FA | 0
Classic FA | 7
26 January – Deccan Arena, Hyderabad
Sudeva Delhi | 2
Zinc FA | 1
26 January – Deccan Arena, Hyderabad
Chennaiyin FC | 3
Muthoot FA | 0

Semi-finals
27 January – Deccan Arena, Hyderabad
Himalayan Kinnaur | 1
Classic FA | 3
28 January – Deccan Arena, Hyderabad
Sudeva Delhi | 2 (8)
Chennaiyin FC | 2 (7)

Final
31 January – Deccan Arena, Hyderabad
Classic FA | 2
Sudeva Delhi | 0

==== Final ====
31 January 2023
TBD IST

| Classic FA | 2–0 | Sudeva Delhi |
|---|---|---|
| Khulakpam Zahir Khan 14' (yellow card) 58'; Gogocha Chungkham 27'; Aheibam Suraj Singh (yellow card) 90+4' | Report | Sursing Purty (yellow card) 45+2' |

Deccan Arena, Hyderabad
Attendance: 150
Referee: Arvind Sekhar A

=== Reliance Foundation Development League ===
Semifinals
1 | Mohun Bagan SG | 1 (6)
2 | Bengaluru | 1 (7)
3 | RFYC | 0
4 | Sudeva Delhi | 1

Final
2 | Bengaluru | 2 (4)
4 | Sudeva Delhi | 2 (3)
Third place
1 | Mohun Bagan SG | 5
3 | RFYC | 1

==== Final ====
14 May 2023
19:00 IST

| Bengaluru | 2–2 | Sudeva Delhi |
|---|---|---|
| H. Thoi Singh 23' (pen.); S. Singh Yadav 67' | Report | S. Lotjem 17'; D. Gurung 49' |
Penalties
| C. Fernandes (penalty scored); S. Singh Yadav (penalty scored); Harpreet (penalty scored); Harmanpreet (penalty scored); H. Thoi Singh (penalty missed) | 4–3 | Paul (penalty scored); S. Lotjem (penalty scored); Bhardwaj (penalty scored); K. Panicker (penalty missed); R. Chhetri (penalty missed) |

Reliance Corporate Park, Mumbai, Maharashtra
Attendance: 50
Referee: Surojit Das

== Futsal ==
=== Futsal Club Championship ===
==== Knockout stage ====
Semi-finals
18 February
Delhi FC | 6
Mohammedan | 7
18 February
Minerva Academy FC | 13
Electric Veng Futsal Club | 8

Final
19 February
Mohammedan | 2 (1)
Minerva Academy FC | 2 (3)

==== Final ====
19 February 2023
19:30 IST

| Mohammedan | 2–2 | Minerva Academy FC |
|---|---|---|
| Suvo Khatoora 14'; Sandeep Oraw 32' | Report | Clinton Rosario D'souza 19'; Thingnam Radhakanta Singh 23' |
Penalties
| | 1–3 |

KD Jadhav Indoor Hall

== Beach Soccer ==
=== National Beach Soccer Championship ===
==== Knockout stage ====
Quarter-finals
31 January
Lakshadweep | 0
Kerala | 5
31 January
Uttarakhand | 13
Arunachal Pradesh | 5
31 January
Punjab | 6
Jharkhand | 4
31 January
Odisha | 5 (1)
Delhi | 5 (3)

Semi-finals
31 January
Kerala | 11
Uttarakhand | 9
31 January
Punjab | 3
Delhi | 2

Final
1 February
Kerala | 13
Punjab | 4
Third place
1 February
Uttarakhand | 1
Delhi | 3

==== Final ====
1 February 2023
16:00 IST

| Kerala | 13–4 | Punjab |
|---|---|---|
| Kamaludheen A 1'; Siju S 5'; Suhail U 7', 12'; Jikson K V 8', 30', 33'; Stephin J 13', 14'; Muhseer Tkb 17', 21'; Roy R 24', 30' | Report | Jikson K V 6' (o.g.); Akash Babu 7'; Siju S 28' (o.g.); Rajwinder Singh 35' |

Arena 2

== Deaths ==
- 28 July 2022: Gulab Chauhan, former FIFA referee and ex-AIFF Executive Committee member.
- 5 August 2022: Narender Thapa, 57, former forward who represented the India national team at the 1984 Asian Cup.
- 7 August 2022: George Ambrose, former Indian international defender who represented the India national team was part of the Indian side that qualified for the AFC Asian Cup Singapore 1984.
- 20 August 2022: Samar Banerjee, 92, a forward who captained India at the 1956 Summer Olympics in Melbourne, where they achieved fourth place.
- 29 September 2022: Sumanta Ghosh, 70, a former FIFA referee.
- 20 November 2022: Babu Mani, 59, a forward who represented the National team at the 1984 AFC Asian Cup.
- 1 February 2023: Parimal Dey, 81, a forward who represented the National team in the 1966 Asian Games in Bangkok.
- 16 February 2023: Tulsidas Balaram, 86, a forward. Along with P. K. Banerjee and Chuni Goswami, Balaram was part of an acclaimed trio of players that helped propel India into what is widely regarded as its golden age of football during the 1950s and 1960s.
- 6 March 2023: Kuppuswami Sampath, 75, a goalkeeper who played for the India national team squad that won a bronze medal at the 1970 Asian Games in Bangkok.

== Retirements ==
- 17 February 2023 : Jeje Lalpekhlua, 32, former striker for East Bengal and National team.

== New clubs ==
| Club | Formation | Location | League | Tier |
|---|---|---|---|---|
| 1 Ladakh FC | 4 April 2023 | Leh, Ladakh | Ladakh Football League | 4th |
| West Lions United FC | 28 April 2023 | Bhavnagar, Gujarat | Gujarat SFA Club Championship | 4th |
