= 2019–20 in Indian football =

Indian football season

Football in India
- Season: 2019–20

Men's football
- ISL: Shield: Goa; Cup: ATK
- I-League: Mohun Bagan
- I-League 2nd Div.: Mohammedan

Women's football
- IWL: Gokulam Kerala

The 2019–20 season is the 132nd competitive association football season in India.

== Men's national team ==
=== India national football team ===
==== 2019 King's Cup ====
India were invited to play King's Cup tournament by Thailand. This was India's first tournament under the new coach, Igor Štimac.

5 June 2019	Curaçao	3–1	India	Buriram
15:30	Bonevacia 15'; Hooi 17'; Bacuna 33'	Report	Chhetri 31' (pen.)	Stadium: Chang Arena; Referee: Chaireag Ngamsom (Thailand)

8 June 2019	India	1–0	Thailand	Buriram
15:30	Thapa 17'	Report		Stadium: Chang Arena; Referee: Jumpei Iida (Japan)

==== 2019 Intercontinental Cup ====
This is the second edition of the Hero Intercontinental Cup, organised by AIFF. This year no national side from other confederation took part other than AFC. India participated along with Syria, Tajikistan and North Korea. India was able to draw their third match against Syria after being defeated by Tajikistan and North Korea in their first two matches.

7 July 2019 Intercontinental Cup	India	2–4	Tajikistan	Ahmedabad, India
20:00 IST	Chhetri 4' (pen.), 41'	AIFF FFT	Tursunov 56'; Boboev 58'; Rahimov 71'; Samiev 75'	Stadium: TransStadia Arena; Attendance: 7,293; Referee: Jasur Mukhtarov (Uzbekistan)

13 July 2019 Intercontinental Cup	India	2–5	North Korea	Ahmedabad, India
20:00 IST	Chhangte 51'; Chhetri 71'	AIFF	Jong Il-gwan 8', 28'; Sim Hyon-jin 16'; Ri Un-chol 63'; Ri Hyong-jin 90+2'	Stadium: TransStadia Arena; Attendance: 9,590; Referee: Akhrol Riskullaev (Uzbekistan)

16 July 2019 Intercontinental Cup	India	1–1	Syria	Ahmedabad, India
20:00 IST	Gahlot 52'	AIFF	Al-Khatib 78' (pen.)	Stadium: TransStadia Arena; Attendance: 10,000; Referee: Jasur Mukhtarov (Uzbekistan)

==== 2022 FIFA World Cup qualification ====
Group E

Pos	Team	Pld	W	D	L	GF	GA	GD	Pts	Qualification	Qatar	Oman	India	Afghanistan	Bangladesh
1	Qatar (Note: Qatar has already qualified for the World Cup as the host nation. They are later selected as host replacement within the qualified teams of the Asian Cup.)	8	7	1	0	18	1	+17	22	Asian Cup	—	2–1	0–0	6–0	5–0
2	Oman	8	6	0	2	16	6	+10	18	World Cup qualifying third round and Asian Cup	0–1	—	1–0	3–0	4–1
3	India	8	1	4	3	6	7	−1	7	Asian Cup qualifying third round	0–1	1–2	—	1–1	1–1
4	Afghanistan	8	1	3	4	5	15	−10	6	Asian Cup qualifying third round	0–1	1–2	1–1	—	1–0
5	Bangladesh	8	0	2	6	3	19	−16	2	Asian Cup qualifying third round	0–2	0–3	0–2	1–1	—

Source: FIFA
Rules for classification: Qualification tiebreakers
Notes:

5 September 2019	India	1–2	Oman	Guwahati, India
19:30 UTC+5:30	Chhetri 24'	Report (FIFA); Report (AFC)	Al-Alawi 82', 90'	Stadium: Indira Gandhi Athletic Stadium; Attendance: 22,798; Referee: Mooud Bonyadifar (Iran)

10 September 2019	Qatar	0–0	India	Doha, Qatar
19:30 UTC+3		Report (FIFA); Report (AFC)		Stadium: Jassim Bin Hamad Stadium; Attendance: 12,020; Referee: Nazmi Nasaruddin (Malaysia)

15 October 2019	India	1–1	Bangladesh	Kolkata, India
19:30 UTC+5:30	Khan 88'		Uddin 42'	Stadium: Salt Lake Stadium; Attendance: 53,286; Referee: Masoud Tufayelieh (Syria)

14 November 2019	Afghanistan	1–1	India	Dushanbe, Tajikistan
19:00 UTC+5	Nazary 45+1'		Doungel 90+3'	Stadium: Central Republican Stadium; Attendance: 8,100; Referee: Yu Ming-hsun (Chinese Taipei)

19 November 2019	Oman	1–0	India	Muscat, Oman
19:00 UTC+4	Al-Ghassani 33'			Stadium: Sultan Qaboos Sports Complex; Attendance: 24,250; Referee: Nivon Robesh Gamini (Sri Lanka)

=== India national under-20 football team ===
==== Friendlies ====
19 July 2019	Oman	2–1	India	Kartepe, Turkey
18:30 IST	34', 78'	Report	Givson Singh Moirangthem 68' (pen.)

22 July 2019	India	1–0	Oman	Kartepe, Turkey
18:30 IST	Rohit Danu 83'	Report	-

27 July 2019 Unofficial	Kocaelispor (Turkey)	1–0	India	Kartepe, Turkey
		Report

Group A

Team	Pld	W	D	L	GF	GA	GD	Pts
Russia	3	3	0	0	7	0	+7	9
Moldova	3	1	1	1	2	2	0	4
Bulgaria	3	0	2	1	1	4	−3	2
India	3	0	1	2	2	6	−4	1

Source: RFS Granatkin

4 June 2019	Russia	3–0	India	Saint Petersburg, Russia
18:00 3:00	Kosarev 50', 73', 82'			Stadium: Petrovsky Stadium; Attendance: 500; Referee: Dmitry Streltsov (Russia)

6 June 2019	Moldova	2–1	India	Saint Petersburg, Russia
12:00 3:00	Puşcaş 54'; Gaiu 56' (p)		Danu 34'	Stadium: Petrovsky Stadium; Attendance: 250; Referee: Yunus Koshko (Russia)

9 June 2019	India	1–1	Bulgaria	Saint Petersburg, Russia
12:00 3:00	Mishra 50'		Rafi 7' (og)	Stadium: Petrovsky Stadium; Attendance: 100; Referee: Oleg Sokolov (Russia)

===== 9–12th place =====
11 June 2019	Kyrgyzstan	1–1 (3–1 p)	India	Saint Petersburg, Russia
14:30 IST	Emir Shigaibaev 88'	RFS AIFF	Akash Mishra 75'	Stadium: Stadium Turbostroitel; Referee: Artem Petrenko (Russia)
	Penalties
	Ryskeldi Artykbaev (penalty scored); Adilet Kanibekov (penalty scored); Ilia Rusakov (penalty scored)		Rohit Danu (penalty scored); Harmanpreet Singh (penalty missed); Lalchhinhima Sailo (penalty missed); Jitendra Singh (penalty missed)

===== 11th place =====
13 June 2019	India	0–1	Tajikistan	Saint Petersburg, Russia
14:30 IST		AIFF RFS	Ozodbek Panzhiev 39'	Stadium: Stadium Turbostroitel; Attendance: 300; Referee: Jan Bobrovsky (Russia)

==== 2019 OFC Youth Development Tournament ====
Group B

Pos	Team	Pld	W	D	L	GF	GA	GD	Pts	Qualification
1	India	2	2	0	0	5	1	+4	6	Final
2	New Caledonia	2	1	0	1	4	5	−1	3	Third place match
3	Vanuatu (H)	2	0	0	2	1	4	−3	0	Fifth place match

Source: OFC
(H) Hosts

18 August 2019	Vanuatu	0–1	India	Port Vila, Vanuatu
11:30 IST		AIFF OCF	Sumit Rathi 78'	Stadium: Korman Stadium; Attendance: 3,000; Referee: Roger Adams (Papua New Guinea)

21 August 2019	India	4–1	New Caledonia	Port Vila, Vanuatu
11:30 IST	Vikram Pratap Singh 17'; Aman Chetri 41'; Ricky John Shabong 74'; Gurkirat Singh 79' (pen.)	OCF AIFF	Lues Waya 83'	Stadium: Korman Stadium; Attendance: 1,500; Referee: Rani Perry (Tahiti)

===== Final =====
24 August 2019	Tahiti	0–2	India	Port Vila, Vanuatu
13:30 IST		OCF AIFF	Manvir Singh 71'; Vikram Pratap Singh 83'	Stadium: Korman Stadium; Attendance: 1,500; Referee: Sione Lelenga (Tonga)

==== 2019 SAFF U-18 Championship ====
Group B

Pos	Team	Pld	W	D	L	GF	GA	GD	Pts	Status
1	India	2	1	1	0	3	0	+3	4	Qualified for Knockout stage
2	Bangladesh	2	1	1	0	3	0	+3	4	Qualified for Knockout stage
3	Sri Lanka	2	0	0	2	0	6	−6	0	

Updated to match(es) played on 25 September 2019. Source: SAFF

23 September 2019	India	0–0	Bangladesh	Kathmandu, Nepal
15:15 IST		Report		Stadium: APF Stadium; Attendance: 300; Referee: Kabin Byanjankar (Nepal)

25 September 2019	Sri Lanka	0–3	India	Kathmandu, Nepal
15:15 IST		Report	Gurkirat Singh 61', 89'; Aman Chetri 90+2'	Stadium: APF Stadium; Attendance: 450; Referee: Virendha Rai (Bhutan)

===== Semi-final =====
27 September 2019	India	4–0	Maldives	Kathmandu, Nepal
15:15 IST	Narender Gahlot 7'; Ahnaf Rasheedh 45+1' (o.g.); Manvir Singh 79'; Ninthoinganba Meetei 81'	Report		Stadium: APF Stadium; Attendance: 350; Referee: Kabin Byanjankar (Nepal)

===== Final =====
29 September 2019	Bangladesh	1–2	India	Kathmandu, Nepal
15:15 IST	Md Yeasin Arafat 40'	Report	Vikram Pratap Singh 2'; Ravi Bahadur Rana 90+1'	Stadium: APF Stadium; Attendance: 500; Referee: Kabin Byanjankar (Nepal)

==== 2020 AFC U-19 Championship qualification ====
Group F

Pos	Team	Pld	W	D	L	GF	GA	GD	Pts	Qualification
1	Saudi Arabia (H)	3	2	1	0	6	1	+5	7	Final tournament
2	Uzbekistan (Note: Uzbekistan, as final tournament hosts, automatically qualified regardless of qualification results.)	3	2	1	0	5	1	+4	7	Final tournament
3	Afghanistan	3	1	0	2	3	3	0	3	
4	India	3	0	0	3	0	9	−9	0	

Source: AFC
Rules for classification: Qualification tiebreakers
(H) Hosts
Notes:

6 November 2019	Uzbekistan	2–0	India	Khobar, Saudi Arabia
18:35 IST	Khoshimov 51'; Olimjonov 65'	AFC AIFF		Stadium: Prince Saud bin Jalawi Stadium; Attendance: 324; Referee: Shaun Evans (Australia)

8 November 2019	India	0–4	Saudi Arabia	Khobar, Saudi Arabia
21:35 IST		AFC AIFF	Marran 2'; Al-Ghamdi 10', 18', 28'	Stadium: Prince Saud bin Jalawi Stadium; Attendance: 2,523; Referee: Feras Taweel (Syria)

10 November 2019	India	0–3	Afghanistan	Khobar, Saudi Arabia
18:35 IST		AFC AIFF	Ramaki 2'; Nawshad 4'; Del 29'	Stadium: Prince Saud bin Jalawi Stadium; Attendance: 180; Referee: Feras Taweel (Syria)

=== India national under-17 football team ===
==== Friendlies ====
30 July 2019	India	4–2	(Thailand) Bangkok Glass FC	Bangkok, Thailand
14:30 IST	Sridarth 13', 47', 79' (pen.); Shubho Paul 68'	Report	22', 23'

4 August 2019	India	7–1	(Thailand) Port F.C.	Bangkok, Thailand
14:30 IST	Sridarth 15', 25'; Port FC 35' (o.g.); Shubho Paul 44'; Maheson Tongbram 69'; Himanshu Jangra 70', 73'	Report	Wiwat 90'

6 August 2019	India	4–1	(Thailand) Chonburi F.C.	Bangkok, Thailand
14:30 IST	Taison Loitongbam 5'; Himanshu Jangra 50'; Sridarth 78', 87'	Report	Nithipan Suksai 36'

9 August 2019	India	2–0	(Thailand) Assumption United FC	Bangkok, Thailand
14:30 IST	Sridarth 40'; Shubho Paul 59'	Report

9 September 2019	India	7–0	(Turkey) Keçiörengücü	Istanbul, Turkey
18:30 IST	Paogoumang Singson 2'; Anish Mazumder 33'; Taison Loitongbam 37'; Shubho Paul 85'; Himanshu Jangra 88', 89' (pen.), 90'	Report

9 September 2019	India	6–3	(Turkey) Fenerbahçe SK	Istanbul, Turkey
20:00 IST	Nongmeikapam 4', 5', 33', 53'; Shubho Paul 12', 30'	Report	Arda Chakirli 14'; Doğukan Tarlaek 37'; Utku Büyükköse 14'

==== 2020 AFC U-16 Championship qualification ====
Group B

Pos	Team	Pld	W	D	L	GF	GA	GD	Pts	Qualification
1	India	3	2	1	0	11	1	+10	7	Final tournament
2	Uzbekistan (H)	3	2	1	0	7	4	+3	7	Final tournament
3	Turkmenistan	3	1	0	2	4	9	−5	3	
4	Bahrain (Note: Bahrain, as final tournament hosts, automatically qualified regardless of qualification results.)	3	0	0	3	2	10	−8	0	Final tournament

Source: AFC
Rules for classification: Qualification tiebreakers
(H) Hosts
Notes:

18 September 2019	India	5–0	Turkmenistan	Tashkent, Uzbekistan
17:00 IST	Paul 23'; Nongmeikapam 40', 90+1'; Taison Loitongbam 55'; Jangra 90'	AFC AIFF		Stadium: Transportation Institute Stadium; Attendance: 55; Referee: Masoud Tufaylieh (Syria)

20 September 2019	Bahrain	0–5	India	Tashkent, Uzbekistan
17:00 IST		AFC AIFF	Nongmeikapam 4', 27'; Mohamed Hasan 25' (o.g.): Paul 45+1', 73'	Stadium: Transportation Institute Stadium; Attendance: 1,110; Referee: Clifford Daypuyat (Philippines)

22 September 2019	India	1–1	Uzbekistan	Tashkent, Uzbekistan
18:00 IST	Nongmeikapam 66'	AFC AIFF	Islamov 81'	Stadium: JAR Stadium

== AFC competitions ==
=== 2020 AFC Champions League ===
==== Preliminary round 1 ====
West Region
Team 1	Score	Team 2
Chennai City (India)	0–1	(Bahrain) Al-Riffa

=== 2020 AFC Cup ===
==== Preliminary round 2 ====
South Asia Zone
Team 1	Agg.	Team 2	1st leg	2nd leg
Paro (Bhutan)	1–10	(India) Bengaluru	0–1	1–9

==== Play-off round ====
South Asia Zone
Team 1	Agg.	Team 2	1st leg	2nd leg
Maziya (Maldives)	4–4 (4–3 p)	(India) Bengaluru	2–1	2–3 (a.e.t.)

==== Group E ====
Pos	Team	Pld	W	D	L	GF	GA	GD	Pts	BAS	MAZ	CHE	TCS
1	(Bangladesh) Bashundhara Kings	1	1	0	0	5	1	+4	3	—	~~4 Nov~~	~~29 Oct~~	5–1
2	(Maldives) Maziya	1	0	1	0	2	2	0	1 (Note: Head-to-head away goals: Maziya 2, Chennai City 0.)	~~23 Oct~~	—	~~1 Nov~~	~~26 Oct~~
3	(India) Chennai City	1	0	1	0	2	2	0	1	~~26 Oct~~	2–2	—	~~4 Nov~~
4	(Maldives) TC Sports	1	0	0	1	1	5	−4	0	~~1 Nov~~	~~29 Oct~~	~~23 Oct~~	—

Source: AFC

== Club competitions ==
=== Indian Super League ===
Pos	Team	Pld	W	D	L	GF	GA	GD	Pts	Qualification
1	Goa (L)	18	12	3	3	46	23	+23	39	Qualification for 2021 AFC Champions League group stage and ISL playoffs
2	ATK (Note: Originally, Mohun Bagan, the 2019–20 I-League champions (they were already assured of the title before the league was abandoned due to the COVID-19 pandemic in India), would qualify as India 2 (2021 AFC Cup group stage), and ATK, the 2020 Indian Super League playoffs winners, would qualify as India 3 (2021 AFC Cup qualifying play-offs). However, ATK owners KGSPL ceased their football operation and bought majority stakes in Mohun Bagan FC (India) Private Limited and rebranded Mohun Bagan football team as ATK Mohun Bagan FC from the 2020–21 Indian Super League which qualified as India 2 in 2021 AFC club competition. The All India Football Federation decided that Bengaluru FC, the 2019–20 Indian Super League regular season 3rd place (behind FC Goa, which qualified for the 2021 AFC Champions League, and ATK), will qualify as India 3.) (C)	18	10	4	4	33	16	+17	34	Advance to ISL playoffs
3	Bengaluru	18	8	6	4	22	13	+9	30	Qualification for 2021 AFC Cup play-off round and ISL playoffs
4	Chennaiyin	18	8	5	5	32	26	+6	29	Advance to ISL playoffs
5	Mumbai City	18	7	5	6	25	29	−4	26	
6	Odisha	18	7	4	7	28	31	−3	25	
7	Kerala Blasters	18	4	7	7	29	32	−3	19	
8	Jamshedpur	18	4	6	8	22	35	−13	18	
9	NorthEast United	18	2	8	8	16	30	−14	14	
10	Hyderabad	18	2	4	12	21	39	−18	10	

Source: Indian Super League
Rules for classification: 1) points; 2) head-to-head points; 3) head-to-head goal difference; 4) head-to-head goals scored; 5) goal difference; 5) number of goals scored; 6) fair play ranking; 6) drawing of lots
(C) Champions; (L) League Winners' Shield Winners

=== I-League ===
Pos	Team	Pld	W	D	L	GF	GA	GD	Pts	Qualification or relegation
1	Mohun Bagan (C)	16	12	3	1	35	13	+22	39	Qualification for 2021 AFC Cup group stage
2	East Bengal	16	6	5	5	23	18	+5	23	
3	Punjab	16	5	8	3	23	21	+2	23	
4	Real Kashmir	15	6	4	5	16	14	+2	22	
5	Gokulam Kerala	15	6	4	5	20	19	+1	22	
6	TRAU	17	6	4	7	17	27	−10	22	
7	Chennai City	15	5	5	5	20	21	−1	20	
8	Churchill Brothers	15	6	2	7	23	21	+2	20	
9	NEROCA	16	5	3	8	27	35	−8	18	
10	Aizawl	15	3	7	5	17	19	−2	16	
11	Indian Arrows	16	2	3	11	7	20	−13	9	

Source: I-league, RSSSF
Rules for classification: 1) points; 2) head-to-head points; 3) head-to-head goal difference; 4) goal difference; 5) number of goals scored; 6) drawing of lots
(C) Champions

=== I-League 2nd Division ===
==== Preliminary round ====
===== Group A =====
Pos	Team	Pld	W	D	L	GF	GA	GD	Pts	Qualification
1	**Garhwal** (Note: Due to the COVID-19 pandemic in India, a shorter format of the league was announced. Therefore, only the top 6 non-reserve clubs advanced to the Final round.)	7	4	2	1	14	8	+6	14	Advance to Final round
2	ATK (R) (Note: Reserves team are ineligible for advancing to the next round. To qualify for promotion, club must hold a 2nd Division license (marked in bold in the table), finish in the top 4, and either 1st or 2nd among the promotion-eligible clubs.)	8	4	2	2	10	9	+1	14	
3	Jamshedpur (R)	8	2	4	2	7	9	−2	10	
4	Punjab (R)	6	3	0	3	8	5	+3	9	
5	Rajasthan (Note: Withdrew team from the league due to financial and other constraits.)	6	1	2	3	4	7	−3	5	Eliminated
6	Lonestar Kashmir	7	1	2	4	8	13	−5	5	Eliminated

===== Group B =====
Pos	Team	Pld	W	D	L	GF	GA	GD	Pts	Qualification
1	**Mohammedan** (Note: Due to the COVID-19 pandemic in India, a shorter format of the league was announced. Therefore, all the non-reserve clubs advanced to the Final Round.)	6	4	0	2	13	6	+7	**12**	Advance to Final round
2	**Bhawanipore**	5	2	2	1	7	7	0	**8**	Advance to Final round
3	Hyderabad (R) (Note: Reserves team are ineligible for advance to the next round To qualify for promotion, a club must hold a 2nd Division license (marked in bold in the table), and finish both in the top 4 of the AIFF, and either 1st or 2nd among the promotion-eligible clubs.)	6	2	2	2	6	6	0	**8**	
4	Chennaiyin (R)	7	2	2	3	8	12	−4	**8**	
5	Bengaluru (R)	6	2	0	4	8	11	−3	**6**	

===== Group C =====
Pos	Team	Pld	W	D	L	GF	GA	GD	Pts	Qualification
1	**ARA** (Note: Due to the COVID-19 pandemic in India, a shorter format of the league was announced. Therefore, all the non-reserve clubs advanced to the Final Round.)	7	4	2	1	15	6	+9	14	Advance to Final Round
2	**Bengaluru United**	8	4	2	2	12	6	+6	14	Advance to Final Round
3	Kerala (Note: Withdrew team from the league due to financial and other constraints.)	7	2	3	2	9	7	+2	9	Pulled out from league
4	Goa (R) (Note: Reserves team are ineligible for advance to the next round To qualify for promotion, a club must hold a 2nd Division license (marked in bold in the table), and finish both in the top 4 of the AIFF, and either 1st or 2nd among the promotion-eligible clubs.)	6	2	3	1	8	6	+2	9	
5	Kerala Blasters (R)	7	1	2	4	8	14	−6	5	
6	Mumbai City (R)	7	1	2	4	4	17	−13	5	

==== Qualifiers ====
Pos	Team	Pld	W	D	L	GF	GA	GD	Pts	Qualification
1	**Mohammedan** (C)	4	3	1	0	7	1	+6	**10**	Champion and Promotion to 2020–21 I-League
2	**Bhawanipore**	4	3	0	1	6	3	+3	**9**	
3	**Bengaluru United**	4	1	2	1	2	3	−1	**5**	
4	**ARA**	4	0	2	2	3	8	−5	**2**	
5	**Garhwal**	4	0	1	3	3	6	−3	**1**	

Source: I League
(C) Champions

=== Indian Women's League ===
==== Group stage ====
===== Group A =====
Pos	Team	Pld	W	D	L	GF	GA	GD	Pts	Qualification
1	KRYPHSA	5	5	0	0	15	0	+15	15	Semi Final
2	Sethu	5	4	0	1	23	2	+21	12	Semi Final
3	Kickstart	5	3	0	2	6	7	−1	9	
4	Kolhapur City	5	1	1	3	3	8	−5	4	
5	Baroda Football Academy	5	1	0	4	3	13	−10	3	
6	BBK Dav	5	0	1	4	1	21	−20	1	

Source: AIFF
Rules for classification: 1) points; 2) head-to-head points; 3) head-to-head goal difference; 4) goal difference; 5) number of goals scored; 6) drawing of lots

===== Group B =====
Pos	Team	Pld	W	D	L	GF	GA	GD	Pts	Qualification
1	Gokulam Kerala	5	5	0	0	28	2	+26	15	Semi Final
2	Kenkre	5	4	0	1	13	14	−1	12	Semi Final
3	Odisha Police	5	2	1	2	9	12	−3	7	
4	Sreebhumi	5	1	2	2	4	5	−1	5	
5	Bangalore United	5	1	1	3	4	9	−5	4	
6	Bidesh XI	5	0	0	5	2	18	−16	0	

Source: AIFF
Rules for classification: 1) points; 2) head-to-head points; 3) head-to-head goal difference; 4) goal difference; 5) number of goals scored; 6) drawing of lots

==== Knock–out stage ====
Semi-finals
1	**KRYPHSA**	3
4	Kenkre	1
3	**Gokulam Kerala**	3
2	Sethu	0

Final
KRYPHSA	2
Gokulam Kerala	3

== Season Statistics ==
=== India national team ===
==== Goalscorers ====
5 goals

- (India) Sunil Chhetri

1 goal

- (India) Adil Khan
- (India) Anirudh Thapa
- (India) Lallianzuala Chhangte
- (India) Narender Gahlot
- (India) Seiminlen Doungel

==== Match Stats ====
Criteria	Team 1	Score	Team 2	Competition
Highest Win	India	1–0	Thailand	2019 King's Cup
Highest Loss	India	2–5	North Korea	2019 Intercontinental Cup

=== India national under-20 team ===
==== Goalscorers ====
3 goals

- (India) Vikram Pratap Singh

2 goals

- (India) Akash Mishra
- (India) Aman Chetri
- (India) Gurkirat Singh
- (India) Manvir Singh
- (India) Rohit Danu

1 goal

- (India) Ahnaf Rasheedh
- (India) Givson Singh Moirangthem
- (India) John Shabong
- (India) Meetei
- (India) Narender Gahlot
- (India) Ravi Bahadur Rana
- (India) Sumit Rathi

1 own goal

- (India) Rafi (against Bulgaria)

==== Match Stats ====
Criteria	Team 1	Score	Team 2	Competition
Highest Win	India	4–0	Maldives	2019 SAFF U-18 Championship
Highest Loss	India	0–4	Saudi Arabia	2020 AFC U-16 Championship qualification
Highest Scoring	India	4–1	New Caledonia	2019 OFC Youth Development Tournament

=== India national under-17 team ===
==== Match Stats ====
Criteria	Team 1	Score	Team 2	Competition
Highest Win	India	7–0	Bhutan; Nepal (Turkey) Keçiörengücü	2019 SAFF U-15 Championship; 2019 SAFF U-15 Championship; Friendly
Highest Loss	–	–	–	–
Highest Scoring	India	6–3	(Turkey) Fenerbahçe SK	Friendly

=== India women's national team ===
==== Match Stats ====
Criteria	Team 1	Score	Team 2	Competition
Highest Win	Sri Lanka	0–6	India	2019 South Asian Games
Highest Loss	India	1–5	Uzbekistan	Friendly
Highest Scoring	India; Sri Lanka	1–5; 0–6	Uzbekistan; India	Friendly; 2019 South Asian Games

=== India women's national under-17 team ===
==== Match Stats ====
Criteria	Team 1	Score	Team 2	Competition
Highest Win	Bhutan	1–10	India	2019 SAFF U-15 Women's Championship
Highest Loss	Sweden	4–0	India	Friendly
Highest Scoring	Bhutan	1–10	India	2019 SAFF U-15 Women's Championship
