= Intercontinental Cup (India) =

International football tournament

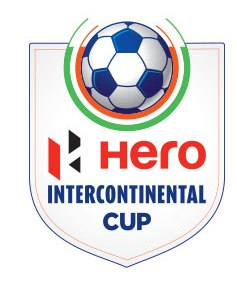
- Organiser(s): AIFF
- Founded: 2018; 8 years ago
- Region: India
- Teams: 4
- Current champions: Syria (1st title)
- Most championships: India (2 titles)
- 2024

The Intercontinental Cup is a four-nation football tournament organised by the All India Football Federation (AIFF). It was launched as a replacement for the Nehru Cup, with the first edition held as the 2018 Intercontinental Cup (India). Naming rights of the tournament were purchased by the Hero MotoCorp, which also sponsored the national team at that time. On 7 January 2023, the AIFF confirmed that the Intercontinental Cup would become an annual competition as part of their "Vision 2047" initiative. The first edition was won by India, while the next edition held in 2019 was won by North Korea.

== Results ==
Year	Host city	Final			3rd place	4th place
Year	Host city	Winner	Score	Runner-up	3rd place	4th place
2018; Details	Mumbai	India	2–0	Kenya	New Zealand	Chinese Taipei
2019; Details	Ahmedabad	North Korea	1–0	Tajikistan	Syria	India
2023; Details	Bhubaneswar	India	2–0	Lebanon	Vanuatu	Mongolia
2024; Details	Hyderabad	Syria	Round robin	Mauritius	India	—

== Medal summary ==
Rank	Nation	Gold	Silver	Bronze	Total
1	India	2	0	1	3
2	Syria	1	0	1	2
3	North Korea	1	0	0	1
4	Kenya	0	1	0	1
4	Lebanon	0	1	0	1
4	Mauritius	0	1	0	1
4	Tajikistan	0	1	0	1
8	New Zealand	0	0	1	1
8	Vanuatu	0	0	1	1
Totals (9 entries)		4	4	4	12

== Statistics ==
=== Goalscorers ===
Players with most goals
Rank	Player	Goals	Apps	Ratio	Last season
1	(India) Sunil Chhetri	13	11	1.18	2023
2	(North Korea) **Jong Il-gwan**	3	4	0.75	2018
3	(North Korea) Ri Hyong-jin	3	4	0.75	2018
4	(India) **Lallianzuala Chhangte**	3	7	0.42	2023
5	(Syria) **Shadi Al Hamwi**	2	3	0.66	2019
6	(Syria) **Mohammad Marmour**	2	3	0.66	2019
7	(Syria) Firas Al Khatib	2	3	0.66	2019
8	(Tajikistan) **Komron Tursunov**	2	4	0.5	2019
9	(Kenya) Jockins Atudo	2	4	0.5	2018

NOTE: Players in bold are still active internationally

== See also ==
- Nehru Cup
- Tri-Nation Series
