= 2023 Gujarat SFA Club Championship =

Football league season in Gujarat, India

Gujarat SFA Club Championship
- Season: 2022–23
- Dates: 3 September 2022 – TBD 2023
- Champions: Baroda FA (1st title)
- Matches: 216

The 2023 Gujarat SFA Club Championship is the second season of the top tier football league of Gujarat. The season started on 3 September 2022, and will end in 2023.

== Changes in format ==
The following changes were made in the league.

- Twelve teams played qualifier round where the three group toppers and two best group runners-up qualified for the league stage.
- The five teams from the qualifying round were joined by previous season's top five teams.
- The final round will see ten teams playing in a double round robin league format where the top team will be champion and nominated for the 2023–24 season of I-League 2.
- The bottom two teams in the final round will be relegated to the inaugural second division in the upcoming season.

== Teams ==
Participating in qualifiers.

| Group | Club | Location |
|---|---|---|
| A | Suryavanshi FC | |
| A | Sharpshooter FC | Ahmedabad |
| A | Bhavnagar FC | Bhavnagar |
| A | Income Tax SRC | Ahmedabad |
| B | Juggernaut FC | |
| B | Kutch FCA | Kutch |
| B | Progressive SA | Ahmedabad |
| B | SAG Academy | Gandhinagar |
| C | CVM FC | Anand |
| C | USI FC Surat | Surat |
| C | Parul FC | Vadodara |
| C | Godhra FC | Godhra |

Participating in league stage.

| Club | Location |
|---|---|
| Rangers FA | Vadodara |
| Baroda FA | Vadodara |
| ARA FC | Ahmedabad |
| Vapi FC | Vapi |
| Income Tax SRC | Ahmedabad |
| CVM FC | Anand |
| RBI | Ahmedabad |
| Suryavanshi FC | |
| SAG Academy | Gandhinagar |
| Parul FC | Vadodara |

== Qualifiers ==
=== Group A ===
| Pos | Team | Pld | W | D | L | GF | GA | GD | Pts | Qualification | IT | SS | SUR | BHA |
|---|---|---|---|---|---|---|---|---|---|---|---|---|---|---|
| 1 | Income Tax SRC | 4 | 3 | 1 | 0 | 8 | 2 | +6 | 10 | Advanced to League stage | — | 2–0 | 1–1 | 3–1 |
| 2 | Sharpshooters FC | 4 | 2 | 0 | 2 | 5 | 8 | −3 | 6 | Possible league stage | — | — | 2–1 | |
| 3 | Suryavanshi FC | 4 | 1 | 1 | 2 | 7 | 4 | +3 | 4 | | | 5–0 | — | — |
| 4 | Bhavnagar FC | 4 | 1 | 0 | 3 | 2 | 8 | −6 | 3 | | 0–2 | 0–3 | 1–0 | — |

Source: GSFA

=== Group B ===
| Pos | Team | Pld | W | D | L | GF | GA | GD | Pts | Qualification | JUG | SAG | PSA | KFCA |
|---|---|---|---|---|---|---|---|---|---|---|---|---|---|---|
| 1 | Juggernaut FC | 4 | 3 | 1 | 0 | 23 | 3 | +20 | 10 | Advanced to League stage | — | 1–1 | 2–0 | 9–0 |
| 2 | SAG FA | 4 | 3 | 1 | 0 | 21 | 1 | +20 | 10 | Possible league stage | | — | 6–0 | — |
| 3 | Progressive FC | 4 | 0 | 1 | 3 | 1 | 12 | −11 | 1 | | — | 0–3 | — | |
| 4 | Kutch FCA | 4 | 0 | 1 | 3 | 3 | 32 | −29 | 1 | | 2–11 | 0–11 | 1–1 | — |

Source: GSFA

=== Group C ===
| Pos | Team | Pld | W | D | L | GF | GA | GD | Pts | Qualification | CVM | PAR | USI | GOD |
|---|---|---|---|---|---|---|---|---|---|---|---|---|---|---|
| 1 | CVM FC | 3 | 3 | 0 | 0 | 19 | 2 | +17 | 9 | Advanced to League stage | — | 2–0 | 6–2 | 11–1 |
| 2 | Parul FC | 4 | 2 | 1 | 1 | 6 | 4 | +2 | 7 | Possible league stage | — | — | | 1–0 |
| 3 | USI Surat FC | 3 | 1 | 0 | 2 | 4 | 10 | −6 | 3 | | 1–0 | 0–3 | — | 3–1 |
| 4 | Godhra FC | 4 | 0 | 1 | 3 | 4 | 17 | −13 | 1 | | | 2–2 | — | — |

Source: GSFA

== League stage ==
=== Standings ===
| Pos | Team | Pld | W | D | L | GF | GA | GD | Pts | Qualification |
|---|---|---|---|---|---|---|---|---|---|---|
| 1 | Baroda FA (C) | 13 | 12 | 0 | 1 | 46 | 8 | +38 | 36 | Champions and possible qualification for 2023–24 I-League 2 |
| 2 | ARA | 12 | 6 | 2 | 4 | 34 | 10 | +24 | 20 | Possible qualification for 2023–24 I-League 2 |
| 3 | Suryavanshi FC | 13 | 6 | 2 | 5 | 20 | 28 | −8 | 20 | |
| 4 | RBI | 12 | 5 | 3 | 4 | 43 | 19 | +24 | 18 | |
| 5 | CVM FC | 12 | 5 | 2 | 5 | 21 | 19 | +2 | 17 | |
| 6 | SAG FA | 12 | 4 | 2 | 6 | 23 | 33 | −10 | 14 | |
| 7 | Parul FC | 9 | 4 | 1 | 4 | 14 | 15 | −1 | 13 | |
| 8 | Rangers FA | 9 | 2 | 3 | 4 | 7 | 11 | −4 | 9 | |
| 9 | Income Tax SRC | 7 | 1 | 1 | 5 | 10 | 24 | −14 | 4 | Relegation to GSFA 2nd Division |
| 10 | Vapi FC | 9 | 1 | 0 | 8 | 10 | 50 | −40 | 3 | Relegation to GSFA 2nd Division |

Source: GSFA
Rules for classification: 1) points; 2) head-to-head points; 3) head-to-head goal difference; 4) head-to-head goals scored; 5) goal difference; 6) number of goals scored; 7) fair play ranking; 8) drawing of lots
(C) Champions
