= Narender Gahlot =

Indian footballer (born 2001)

Personal information
- Full name: Narender Gahlot
- Date of birth: 24 April 2001 (age 25)
- Place of birth: Mitraon, Delhi, India
- Height: 1.84 m (6 ft 0 in)
- Positions: Centre-back; right-back

Team information
- Current team: East Bengal

Youth career
- 2017: Chandigarh Football Academy

Senior career*
| Years | Team | Apps | (Gls) |
| 2017–2019 | Indian Arrows | 11 | (0) |
| 2019–2022 | Jamshedpur | 36 | (0) |
| 2022–2026 | Odisha | 37 | (0) |
| 2026 | Inter Kashi | 10 | (0) |
| 2026– | East Bengal | 0 | (0) |

International career^{‡}
| 2016–2017 | India U17 | 7 | (0) |
| 2019–2021 | India U20 | 4 | (1) |
| 2019–2024 | India U23 | 7 | (0) |
| 2019–2022 | India | 4 | (1) |
- * Club domestic league appearances and goals as of 11:54, 21 May 2026 (UTC) ‡ National team caps and goals as of 30 October 2022

Narender Gahlot (born 24 April 2001) is an Indian professional footballer who plays as a defender for Indian Super League club East Bengal.

== Club career ==
=== Indian Arrows ===
He made his professional debut playing for the Indian Arrows in 2018–19 I-League.

=== Odisha ===
In May 2022, Indian Super League club Odisha completed the signing of Gahlot, on a three-year deal. On 17 August, he made his debut for the club against NorthEast United in the Durand Cup, in a thumping 6–0 win.

=== Inter Kashi ===
It was announced that on 30 January 2026, Inter Kashi has signed him as a prominent defender.

== International career ==
He made his international debut for India senior team on 7 July 2019 against Tajikistan during 2019 Intercontinental Cup, which India lost 2–4. He scored his first ever international goal in his second match against Syria on 16 July 2019 at the EKA arena in Ahmedabad. With this goal he became the first Indian player to score for the national team who was born in the 21st century and also became the then second youngest goal scorer for the national team at the age of 18 years 83 days behind Jerry Zirsanga. He also won his first Player of the match award in this match, as the game finished 1–1.

== Career statistics ==
=== Club ===
As of 31 January 2026

| Club | Season | League | | | Cup | | AFC | | Total | |
| Club | Season | Division | Apps | Goals | Apps | Goals | Apps | Goals | Apps | Goals |
|---|---|---|---|---|---|---|---|---|---|---|
| Indian Arrows | 2017–18 | I-League | 1 | 0 | 0 | 0 | — | | 1 | 0 |
| Indian Arrows | 2018–19 | I-League | 10 | 0 | 2 (Note: Appearance(s) in Super Cup) | 0 | — | | 13 | 0 |
| Indian Arrows | Indian Arrows total | | 11 | 0 | 2 | 0 | 0 | 0 | 13 | 0 |
| Jamshedpur | 2019–20 | Indian Super League | 11 | 0 | 0 | 0 | — | | 11 | 0 |
| Jamshedpur | 2020–21 | Indian Super League | 10 | 0 | 0 | 0 | — | | 10 | 0 |
| Jamshedpur | 2021–22 | Indian Super League | 15 | 0 | 0 | 0 | — | | 15 | 0 |
| Jamshedpur | Jamshedpur total | | 36 | 0 | 0 | 0 | 0 | 0 | 36 | 0 |
| Odisha | 2022–23 | Indian Super League | 17 | 0 | 10 (Note: Appearance(s) in Durand Cup) | 0 | 1 (Note: Appearance in AFC Cup playoff) | 0 | 29 | 0 |
| Odisha | 2023–24 | Indian Super League | 15 | 0 | 1 | 0 | 3 (Note: Appearance in AFC Cup playoff) | 0 | 19 | 0 |
| Odisha | 2024–25 | Indian Super League | 4 | 0 | 0 | 0 | 0 | 0 | 4 | 0 |
| Odisha | Odisha total | | 36 | 0 | 11 | 0 | 4 | 0 | 51 | 0 |
| Kashi | 2025-26 | Indian Super League | | | | | | | | |
| Career total | | | 83 | 0 | 13 | 0 | 4 | 0 | 100 | 0 |

=== International ===
As of matches played till 24 September 2022

| National team | Year | Apps | Goals |
|---|---|---|---|
| India | 2019 | 3 | 1 |
| India | 2022 | 1 | 0 |
| Total | | 4 | 1 |

=== International goals ===
Scores and results list India's goal tally first

| No. | Date | Venue | Cap | Opponent | Score | Result | Competition | Ref. |
|---|---|---|---|---|---|---|---|---|
| 1. | 16 July 2019 | TransStadia Arena, Ahmedabad, India | 2 | Syria | 1–0 | 1–1 | 2019 Intercontinental Cup | |

== Honours ==
Jamshedpur

- Indian Super League Winners' Shield: 2021–22

Odisha

- Super Cup: 2023; runner-up: 2024

India U20

- SAFF U-18 Championship: 2019
