= 2019 Intercontinental Cup (India) =

International football tournament

2019 Hero Intercontinental Cup
Tournament details
- Host country: India
- City: Ahmedabad, Gujarat
- Dates: 7–19 July 2019
- Teams: 4 (from 1 confederation)
- Venue: 1 (in 1 host city)

Final positions
- Champions: North Korea (1st title)
- Runners-up: Tajikistan
- Third place: Syria
- Fourth place: India

Tournament statistics
- Matches played: 7
- Goals scored: 26 (3.71 per match)
- Attendance: 30,672 (4,382 per match)
- Top scorer(s): (India) Sunil Chhetri (North Korea) Jong Il-gwan (North Korea) Ri Hyong-jin (3 goals each)
- Best player: (North Korea) Jong Il-gwan

The 2019 Intercontinental Cup (known as the 2019 Hero Intercontinental Cup for sponsorship reasons, was the second edition of the Intercontinental Cup, a 4-nations football tournament held at TransStadia Arena in the Indian city of Ahmedabad between the 7th and 19th of July 2019. The tournament was organized by the AIFF.

North Korea won the title by a 1–0 victory over Tajikistan in the final.

== Participating nations ==
Though the tournament was supposed to be played by teams from different confederations, in this edition of the Intercontinental Cup all teams participating were from AFC only. All the four teams played each other in a round robin phase and the top two teams played the final.

The FIFA Rankings of participating national teams, as of 14 June 2019:

- Syria (85) - first appearance
- India (101) - second appearance - host
- Tajikistan (120) - first appearance
- North Korea (122) - first appearance

== Venue ==
- All matches held at the TransStadia Arena, Ahmedabad, India.

Ahmedabad	2019 Intercontinental Cup (India) is located in India
TransStadia Arena (EKA Arena)	2019 Intercontinental Cup (India) is located in India
23°00′39.7″N 72°35′56.8″E	2019 Intercontinental Cup (India) is located in India
Capacity: 24,000 seats	2019 Intercontinental Cup (India) is located in India

== Matches ==
- Times listed are UTC+05:30.

=== Round Robin ===
Pos	Team	Pld	W	D	L	GF	GA	GD	Pts	Qualification
1	Tajikistan	3	2	0	1	6	3	+3	6	Advance to Final
2	North Korea	3	2	0	1	8	7	+1	6	Advance to Final
3	Syria	3	1	1	1	6	5	+1	4	Third Place
4	India (H)	3	0	1	2	5	10	−5	1	Fourth Place

Source: Soccerway
(H) Hosts
7 July 2019
20:00

India	2–4	Tajikistan
Chhetri 4' (pen.), 41'	AIFF; FFT	Tursunov 56'; Boboev 58'; Rahimov 71'; Samiev 75'

TransStadia Arena, Ahmedabad
Attendance: 7,293
Referee: Jasur Mukhtarov (Uzbekistan)
8 July 2019
20:00

Syria	5–2	North Korea
Al Hamwi 41', 61'; Marmour 56', 65'; Al-Khatib 90'	AIFF	Jong Il-gwan 3'; Ri Hyong-jin 78'

TransStadia Arena, Ahmedabad
Attendance: 681
Referee: Venkatesh Ramachandran (India)

10 July 2019
20:00

Tajikistan	2–0	Syria
Tursunov 46'; Barotov 67'	AIFF; FFT

TransStadia Arena, Ahmedabad
Attendance: 732
Referee: Rahul Kumar Gupta (India)
13 July 2019
20:00

India	2–5	North Korea
Chhangte 51'; Chhetri 71'	AIFF	Jong Il-gwan 8', 28'; Sim Hyon-jin 16'; Ri Un-chol 63'; Ri Hyong-jin 90+2'

TransStadia Arena, Ahmedabad
Attendance: 9,590
Referee: Akhrol Riskullaev (Uzbekistan)

15 July 2019
20:00

North Korea	1–0	Tajikistan
Ri Hyong-jin 33'	AIFF; FFT

TransStadia Arena, Ahmedabad
Attendance: 634
Referee: Venkatesh Ramachandran (India)
16 July 2019
20:00

India	1–1	Syria
Gahlot 52'	AIFF	Al-Khatib 78' (pen.)

TransStadia Arena, Ahmedabad
Attendance: 10,000
Referee: Jasur Mukhtarov (Uzbekistan)

=== Final ===
19 July 2019
20:00

Tajikistan	0–1	North Korea
	AIFF; FFT	Pak Hyon-il 71'

TransStadia Arena, Ahmedabad
Attendance: 1,832
Referee: Akhrol Riskullaev (Uzbekistan)

== Winners ==
2019 Intercontinental Cup Champion

North Korea
First title

== Statistics ==
=== Goalscorers ===
There were 26 goals scored in 7 matches, for an average of 3.71 goals per match.

3 goals

- (India) Sunil Chhetri
- (North Korea) Jong Il-gwan
- (North Korea) Ri Hyong-jin

2 goals

- (Syria) Shadi Al Hamwi
- (Syria) Mohammad Marmour
- (Syria) Firas Al-Khatib
- (Tajikistan) Komron Tursunov

1 goal

- (India) Lallianzuala Chhangte
- (India) Narender Gahlot
- (North Korea) Pak Hyon-il
- (North Korea) Ri Un-chol
- (North Korea) Sim Hyon-jin
- (Tajikistan) Ilhomjon Barotov
- (Tajikistan) Sheriddin Boboev
- (Tajikistan) Muhammadjon Rahimov
- (Tajikistan) Shahrom Samiev

== Broadcasting rights ==
Country	Broadcaster
India (host)	Star Sports 2
