= Jong Il-gwan =

North Korean footballer (born 1992)

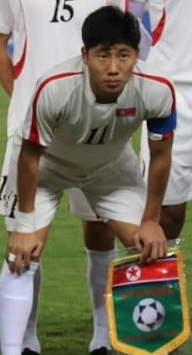
- Jong with North Korea in 2019

Personal information
- Date of birth: 30 October 1992 (age 34)
- Place of birth: Sariwon, North Korea
- Height: 1.75 m (5 ft 9 in)
- Position: Striker

Team information
- Current team: Rimyongsu
- Number: 30

Senior career*
Years	Team	Apps	(Gls)
2011–2017	Rimyongsu		
2017–2018	Luzern	4	(1)
2018	→ FC Wil (loan)	2	(0)
2018–20??	Rimyongsu		
20??–2024	Choson University		
2024–	Ryomyong		

International career^{‡}
	North Korea U20	3	(0)
2011–	North Korea	85	(31)
Medal record
Representing North Korea
Men's football
Asian Games
Silver medal – second place	2014 Incheon	Team
- * Club domestic league appearances and goals as of 27 March 2018 ‡ National team caps and goals as of 19 November 2024

- Jong Il-gwan
- Hangul: 정일관
- Hanja: 鄭日冠
- RR: Jeong Ilgwan
- MR: Chŏng Ilgwan

Jong Il-gwan (Korean: 정일관; born 30 October 1992) is a North Korean professional footballer who plays as a striker for DPR Korea Premier Football League club Ryomyong and the North Korea national team. He is the country's all-time top scorer.

== Club career ==
On 24 November 2010, Jong was crowned AFC Youth Player of the Year. On 5 June 2012, numerous reports surfaced linking the player with a move to Newcastle United with later reports strongly linking him with FK Partizan and PSV Eindhoven. He was transferred to Swiss Super League club FC Luzern in July 2017, signing a two-year contract.

On 1 August 2022, Jong won his club's first ever Hwaebul Cup after scoring a 96th-minute winner for Ryomyong against April 25 in a 2–1 win.

On 19 March 2024, the Japanese newspaper Choson Sinbo revealed that Jong signed for Choson University of Physical Education club.

On 30 August 2024, a Championat Asia article revealed that Jong had joined Ryomyong.

== International career ==
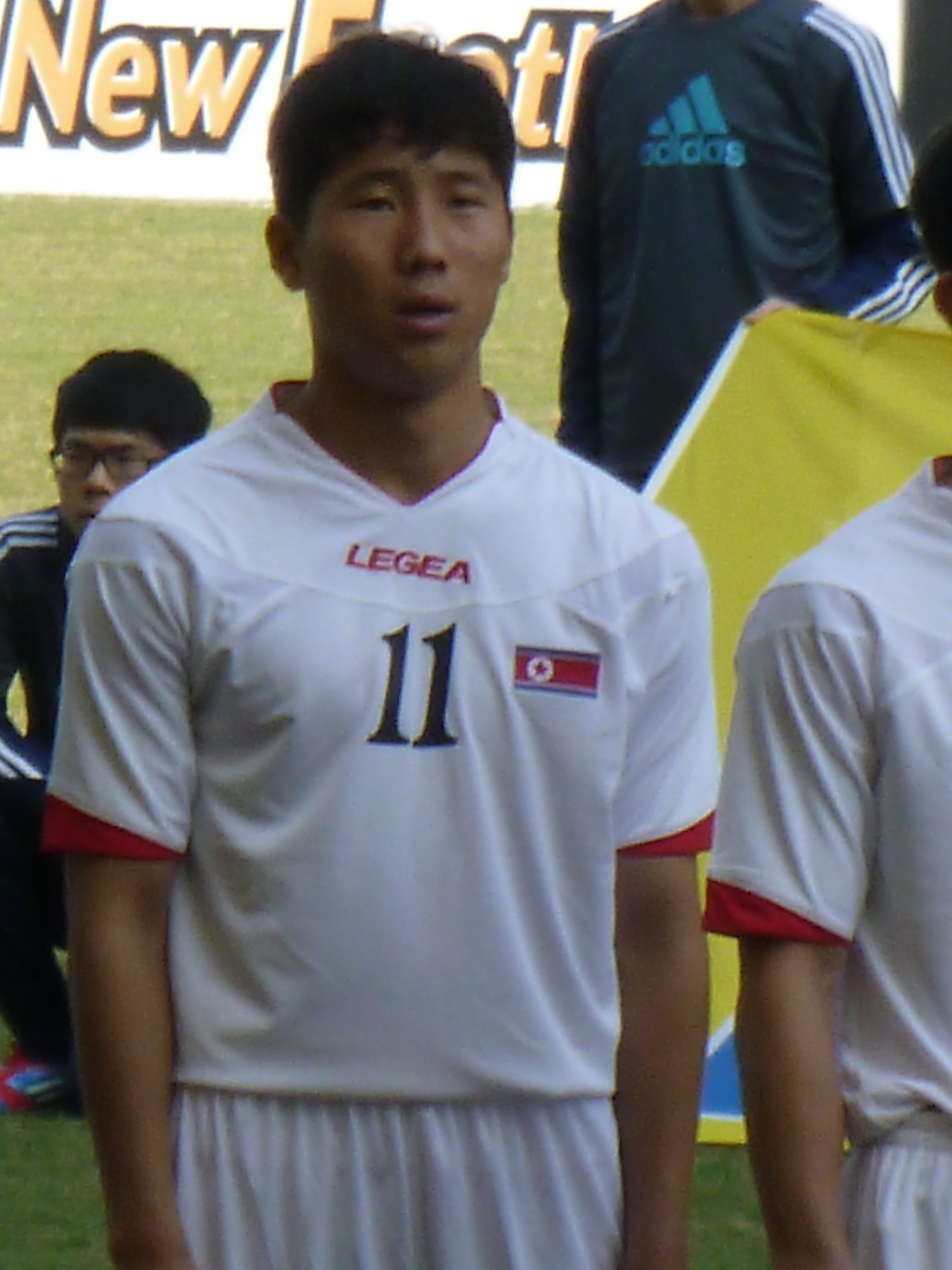
Jong lining up with North Korea in 2012.

Jong made his senior international debut for North Korea on 26 March 2011 against Iraq in a 2–0 defeat.

Jong made his EAFF preliminaries debut in 2012 against Chinese Taipei. He scored his first competition goal in a 5–0 win against Guam in the second preliminary round. Jong scored a brace in 2014 against the same opposition for the second preliminary round, helping his side qualify for the final tournament. He scored another goal against Chinese Taipei and Hong Kong in 2016 for the 2017 edition's second preliminaries. On 16 December 2017, Jong scored a stunning free kick against China in a 1–1 draw.

In the 2019 AFC Asian Cup, Jong was named captain of the national team. Against Qatar, he was sent off towards the end of the match.

On 21 November 2023, Jong scored his first international hat-trick against Myanmar in a 6–1 win at the Thuwunna Stadium during the 2026 FIFA World Cup qualification phase.

On 6 June 2024, Jong scored a 90+2' stoppage time winner against Syria. That goal helped North Korea stay in the running for the third round of qualifying.

== Style of play ==
Jong is known for being a pacy and technical forward who can play on either flanks or up top. He has an expert first touch and vision and has an eye for exploiting spaces in between defenders. Jong is also a set piece specialist, scoring multiple free kicks in his international career.

== Career statistics ==
=== International ===
As of match played 10 October 2024

Scores and results list North Korean goal tally first, score column indicates score after each Jong goal.

List of international goals scored by Jong Il-gwan
No.	Date	Venue	Opponent	Score	Result	Competition
1	9 April 2011	Dasarath Rangasala Stadium, Kathmandu, Nepal	Nepal	1–0	1–0	2012 AFC Challenge Cup qualification
2	19 March 2012	Dasarath Rangasala Stadium, Kathmandu, Nepal	Turkmenistan	1–1	2–1	2012 AFC Challenge Cup
3	10 September 2012	Gelora Bung Karno Stadium, Jakarta, Indonesia	Indonesia	2–0	2–0	Friendly
4	3 December 2012	Mong Kok Stadium, Mong Kok, Hong Kong	Guam	5–0	5–0	2013 EAFF East Asian Cup qualification
5	16 November 2014	Taipei Municipal Stadium, Taipei, Taiwan	Guam	1–0	5–1	2015 EAFF East Asian Cup preliminary
6	16 November 2014	Taipei Municipal Stadium, Taipei, Taiwan	Guam	2–1	5–1	2015 EAFF East Asian Cup preliminary
7	3 September 2015	Bahrain National Stadium, Riffa, Bahrain	Bahrain	1–0	1–0	2018 FIFA World Cup qualification
8	13 October 2015	Kim Il Sung Stadium, Pyongyang, North Korea	Yemen	1–0	1–0	2018 FIFA World Cup qualification
9	17 November 2015	Kim Il Sung Stadium, Pyongyang, North Korea	Bahrain	2–0	2–0	2018 FIFA World Cup qualification
10	14 August 2016	UiTM Stadium, Shah Alam, Malaysia	Iraq	1–0	1–0	Friendly
11	21 August 2016	Tuanku Abdul Rahman Stadium, Paroi, Malaysia	Iraq	1–0	1–1	Friendly
12	24 August 2016	Shanghai Stadium, Shanghai, China	United Arab Emirates	1–0	2–0	Friendly
13	10 October 2016	Rizal Memorial Stadium, Manila, Philippines	Philippines	1–0	3–1	Friendly
14	6 November 2016	Mong Kok Stadium, Mong Kok, Hong Kong	Chinese Taipei	1–0	2–0	2017 EAFF E-1 Football Championship qualification
15	12 November 2016	Mong Kok Stadium, Mong Kok, Hong Kong	Hong Kong	1–0	1–0	2017 EAFF E-1 Football Championship qualification
16	10 November 2017	New I-Mobile Stadium, Buriram, Thailand	Malaysia	4–0	4–1	2019 AFC Asian Cup qualification
17	16 December 2017	Ajinomoto Stadium, Tokyo, Japan	China	1–1	1–1	2017 EAFF E-1 Football Championship
18	27 March 2018	Kim Il Sung Stadium, Pyongyang, North Korea	Hong Kong	1–0	2–0	2019 AFC Asian Cup qualification
19	11 November 2018	Taipei Municipal Stadium, Taipei, Taiwan	Mongolia	4–0	4–1	2019 EAFF E-1 Football Championship qualification
20	16 November 2018	Taipei Municipal Stadium, Taipei, Taiwan	Chinese Taipei	1–0	2–0	2019 EAFF E-1 Football Championship qualification
21	25 December 2018	Mỹ Đình National Stadium, Hanoi, Vietnam	Vietnam	1–1	1–1	Friendly
22	8 July 2019	TransStadia Arena, Ahmedabad, India	Syria	1–0	2–5	2019 Intercontinental Cup
23	13 July 2019	TransStadia Arena, Ahmedabad, India	India	1–0	5–2	2019 Intercontinental Cup
24	13 July 2019	TransStadia Arena, Ahmedabad, India	India	2–0	5–2	2019 Intercontinental Cup
25	5 September 2019	Kim Il Sung Stadium, Pyongyang, North Korea	Lebanon	1–0	2–0	2022 FIFA World Cup qualification
26	5 September 2019	Kim Il Sung Stadium, Pyongyang, North Korea	Lebanon	2–0	2–0	2022 FIFA World Cup qualification
27	21 November 2023	Thuwunna Stadium, Yangon, Myanmar	Myanmar	1–0	6–1	2026 FIFA World Cup qualification
28	21 November 2023	Thuwunna Stadium, Yangon, Myanmar	Myanmar	4–0	6–1	2026 FIFA World Cup qualification
29	21 November 2023	Thuwunna Stadium, Yangon, Myanmar	Myanmar	5–0	6–1	2026 FIFA World Cup qualification
30	6 June 2024	New Laos National Stadium, Vientiane, Laos	Syria	1–0	1–0	2026 FIFA World Cup qualification
31	10 October 2024	Hazza bin Zayed Stadium, Al Ain, United Arab Emirates	United Arab Emirates	1–1	1–1	2026 FIFA World Cup qualification

== Honours ==
North Korea U20

- AFC U-19 Championship: 2010

North Korea

- Hero Intercontinental Cup: 2019

Individual

- 2010 AFC U-19 Championship Golden Ball
- Hero Intercontinental Cup Best player: 2019
