= Gujarat SFA Club Championship =

Men's professional football league in the Indian state of Gujarat

Gujarat State Football Association Club Championship
- Organising body: Gujarat State Football Association (GSFA)
- Founded: 2022; 4 years ago
- Country: India
- Number of clubs: 10 (final round)
- Level on pyramid: 5
- Promotion to: I-League 3
- Current champions: Charutar Vidya Mandal FC (2nd title)
- Broadcaster(s): GSFA (YouTube)
- Website: GSFA
- Current: 2026

The Gujatat State Football Association Club Championship is the highest state-level football league in the Indian state of Gujarat. It is organised by Gujarat State Football Association (GSFA). The league is also the 5th tier of the Indian football league system.

== Current teams ==
Eight final round teams from the previous edition along with the two teams from qualifiers participated in the 2022–23 season of Gujarat SFA Club Championship.

Teams	Venue
Baroda FA	EKA Arena
Charutar Vidya Mandal FC	EKA Arena
ARA FC	EKA Arena
Suryavanshi FC	EKA Arena
RBI	EKA Arena
Rangers FA	EKA Arena
Parul FC	EKA Arena
SAG FA	EKA Arena
Income Tax SRC	EKA Arena
Vapi FC	EKA Arena

== Champions ==
Season	Champions	Runners-up	Ref.
2022	ARA	RBI	
2023	Baroda FA	ARA	
2024	Charutar Vidya Mandal FC	Baroda FA	
2025	ARA	Charutar Vidya Mandal FC	
2026	Charutar Vidya Mandal FC	RBI	

== See also ==
- Gujarat Super League
