= Mohammad Al Marmour =

Syrian footballer (born 1995)

Personal information
- Full name: Mohammad Al Marmour
- Date of birth: 4 January 1995 (age 31)
- Place of birth: Latakia, Syria
- Height: 1.70 m (5 ft 7 in)
- Positions: Attacking midfielder; winger

Team information
- Current team: Al-Najaf

Youth career
- 2007–2008: Hutteen
- 2009–2013: Tishreen

Senior career*
| Years | Team | Apps | (Gls) |
| 2013–2017 | Tishreen | | |
| 2017–2018 | Safa | 7 | (3) |
| 2018–2021 | Tishreen | | |
| 2021–2022 | Mesaimeer | | |
| 2022–2023 | Al-Manama | | |
| 2023–2024 | Ahed | 1 | (2) |
| 2024–2025 | Al-Najma | | |
| 2025– | Al-Najaf | | |

International career^{‡}
| 2017 | Syria U23 | | |
| 2017– | Syria | 35 | (4) |
- * Club domestic league appearances and goals ‡ National team caps and goals as of 6 September 2024

Mohammad Al Marmour (Arabic: مُحَمَّد الْمَرْمُور; born 4 January 1995) is a Syrian footballer who plays as an attacking midfielder or a winger for the Syria national team.

== Club career ==
Despite denying rumors that he was going to join Safa in mid-2017, Al Marmour eventually penned a contract with the Lebanese side, even rejecting lucrative offers from Syrian outfit Al-Jaish. At Safa the Syrian midfielder three goals, against Salam Zgharta, Akhaa Ahli Aley, and Ansar, respectively.

On 28 July 2020, Al Marmour scored the only goal for Tishreen in a 1–0 win against Al-Karamah to grant them their third league title since 1997.

=== Al Ahed ===
In May 2023, Lebanese Premier League side Ahed announced the signing of Al Marmour. In his first League match with Ahed, he scored a brace against Racing. Ahed announced departure of Marmour in June 2024.

== Career statistics ==
=== International ===
Scores and results list Syria's goal tally first.

| No. | Date | Venue | Opponent | Score | Result | Competition |
|---|---|---|---|---|---|---|
| 1. | 22 August 2017 | Hang Jebat Stadium, Malacca, Malaysia | Malaysia | 1–0 | 2–1 | Friendly |
| 2. | 8 July 2019 | The Arena, Ahmedabad, India | North Korea | 2–1 | 5–2 | 2019 Hero Intercontinental Cup |
| 3. | 8 July 2019 | The Arena, Ahmedabad, India | North Korea | 4–1 | 5–2 | 2019 Hero Intercontinental Cup |
| 4. | 24 March 2022 | Saida Municipal Stadium, Sidon, Lebanon | Lebanon | 3–0 | 3–0 | 2022 FIFA World Cup qualification |

== Honours ==
Ahed

- Lebanese Super Cup runner-up: 2023
- AFC Cup runner-up: 2023–24
