= Tankadhar Bag =

Indian footballer (born 2003)

Personal information
- Date of birth: 7 December 2003 (age 22)
- Place of birth: Odisha, India
- Position: Right-back

Team information
- Current team: Samaleswari

Youth career
- Sports Odisha

Senior career*
Years	Team	Apps	(Gls)
2020–2022	Indian Arrows	22	(0)
2023–2026	Odisha	0	(0)
2026–	Samaleswari		

International career
2022–2023	India U20	5	(1)
- * Club domestic league appearances and goals as of 21:33, 18 April 2022 (UTC)

Tankadhar Bag (born 7 December 2003) is an Indian professional footballer who plays as a defender for the Indian Football League club Samaleswari.

== Career ==
Tankadhar Bag made his first professional appearance for Indian Arrows on 10 January 2021 against Churchill Brothers.

== Career statistics ==
=== Club ===
As of 18 January 2023

Club	Season	League			Cup		Continental		Total	
Club	Season	Division	Apps	Goals	Apps	Goals	Apps	Goals	Apps	Goals
Indian Arrows	2020–21	I-League	10	0	0	0	—		10	0
Indian Arrows	2021–22	I-League	12	0	0	0	—		12	0
Career total			22	0	0	0	0	0	22	0

== Honours ==
India U20

- SAFF U-20 Championship: 2022
