= Otero de Herreros =

- Municipality
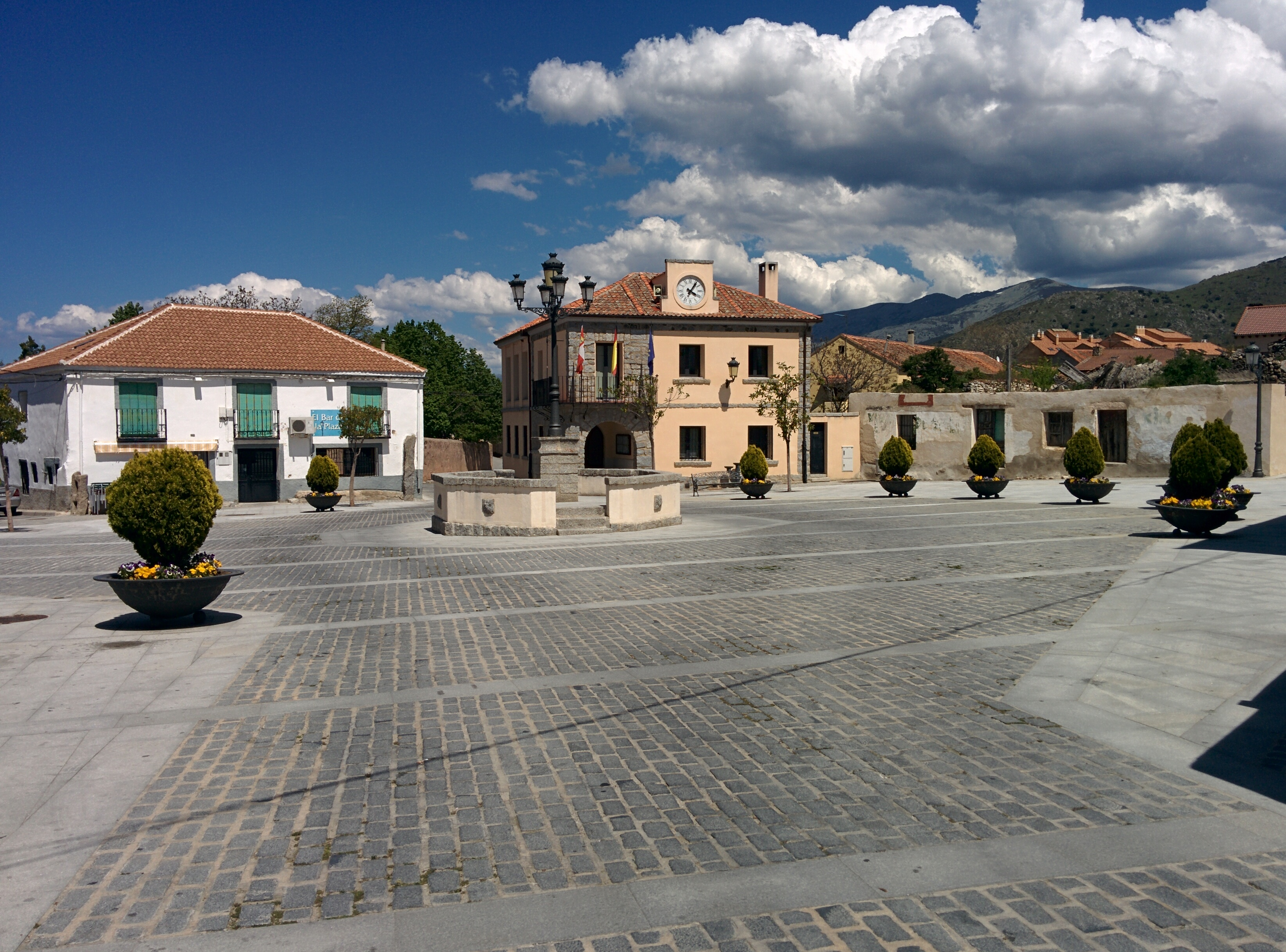
- Main square

- Location in Spain. Otero de Herreros (Spain)
- Coordinates: 40°49′11″N 4°12′33″W
- Country: Spain
- Autonomous community: Castile and León
- Province: Segovia
- Municipality: Otero de Herreros

Area
  - Total: 43 km^{2} (17 sq mi)

Population (2025-01-01)
  - Total: 987
  - Density: 23/km^{2} (59/sq mi)
- Time zone: UTC+1 (CET)
  - Summer (DST): UTC+2 (CEST)
- Website: Official website

Otero de Herreros is a municipality located in the province of Segovia, Castile and León, Spain. According to the 2004 census (INE), the municipality has a population of 873 inhabitants.
