= 2022 SAFF U-20 Championship =

Tournament details
- Host country: India
- Dates: 25 July – 5 August
- Teams: 5 (from 1 sub-confederation)
- Venue(s): Kalinga Stadium, Bhubaneswar (in 1 host city)

Final positions
- Champions: India (2nd title)
- Runners-up: Bangladesh
- Third place: Nepal

Tournament statistics
- Matches played: 11
- Goals scored: 40 (3.64 per match)
- Attendance: 13,180 (1,198 per match)
- Top scorer(s): (India) Gurkirat Singh (8 goals)
- Best player: (India) Gurkirat Singh
- Best goalkeeper: (India) Som Kumar

The 2022 SAFF U-20 Championship was the 4th edition of the SAFF U-20 Championship, an international football competition for men's under-18 national teams organized by South Asian Football Federation (SAFF). India was the hosts of the tournament, held between 25 July and 5 August 2022.

India clinched the title defeating Bangladesh by 5–2 in the final on 5 August 2022.

== Venue ==
All matches were played at Kalinga Stadium in Bhubaneswar, India.

Bhubaneswar	Bhubaneswar is located in India
Kalinga Stadium	Bhubaneswar is located in India
Capacity: 16,000	Bhubaneswar is located in India

== Participating teams ==
FIFA suspended Pakistan Football Federation on 7 April 2021, so they cannot participate in this competition. Bhutan abstained from participation due to government restrictions.

Team	Appearances in the SAFF U-20 Championship	Previous best performance
Bangladesh	4th	Runners-up (2017, 2019)
India (Host)	4th	Champions (2019)
Maldives	4th	Group Stage
Nepal	4th	Champions (2015, 2017)
Sri Lanka	2nd	Group Stage

== Players eligibility ==
Players born on or after 1 January 2003 are eligible to compete in the tournament. Each team has to register a squad of minimum 16 players and maximum 23 players, minimum two of whom must be goalkeepers.

== Officials ==
Referees

- Mohammed Nassir Uddin (Bangladesh)
- S. M. Junayed Sharif (Bangladesh)
- Mrutyunjay Lingaraj Amatya (India)
- Sinan Hussain (Maldives)
- Afsah Ahmed (Maldives)
- Prajwol Chhetri (Nepal)
- Kanaya K. Yadav (Nepal)
- (Sri Lanka) W. Lakmal Weerakody (Sri Lanka)

Assistant Referees

- Suman Majumdar (India)
- (Sri Lanka) D. D. I. Sendanayaka (Sri Lanka)

== Round robin stage ==
- Times listed are UTC+05:30.

Key to colours in group tables
Table top two teams will advance to the final

Pos	Team	Pld	W	D	L	GF	GA	GD	Pts	Status
1	Bangladesh	4	3	1	0	8	3	+5	10	Qualified for Final
2	India (H, C)	4	3	0	1	14	2	+12	9	Qualified for Final
3	Nepal	4	2	1	1	8	9	−1	7	
4	Maldives	4	0	1	3	2	10	−8	1	
5	Sri Lanka	4	0	1	3	1	9	−8	1	

Source: GSA
Rules for classification: 1) points; 2) head-to-head points; 3) head-to-head goal difference; 4) goal difference; 5) number of goals scored; 6) drawing of lots
(C) Champions; (H) Hosts

25 July 2022
18:30

Nepal	4–0	Maldives
Gurung 42'; Suwal 57'; Chhunju 62'; Nakarmi 90+4'	Report

Attendance: 100
Referee: Mrutyunjay Lingaraj Amatya (India)
25 July 2022
19:00

Sri Lanka	0–1	Bangladesh
	Report	Mirajul 71'

Attendance: 100
Referee: Prajwol Chhetri (Nepal)

27 July 2022
16:00

Bangladesh	2–1	India
Nova 27', 45+1' (pen.)	Report	Gurkirat 35'

Attendance: 500
Referee: Sinan Hussain (Maldives)
27 July 2022
19:00

Sri Lanka	0–3	Nepal
	Report	Ghalan 58'; Chhunju 64'; Nakarmi 83'

Attendance: 200
Referee: Mohammed Nassir Uddin (Bangladesh)

29 July 2022
16:00

India	4–0	Sri Lanka
Jangra 50'; Gogoi 69', 90+3'; Gurkirat 74' (pen.)	Report

Attendance: 500
Referee: Mohammed Nassir Uddin (Bangladesh)
29 July 2022
19:00

Maldives	1–4	Bangladesh
Zafar 53'	Report	Mirajul 19', 22', 42'; Rafiq 42'

Attendance: 200
Referee: W. Lakmal Weerakkody (Sri Lanka)

31 July 2022
16:00

Maldives	1–1	Sri Lanka
Aiham 74'	Report	Thushmika 90+6'

Attendance: 99
Referee: Mrutyunjay Lingaraj Amatya (India)
31 July 2022
19:00

Nepal	0–8	India
	Report	Loitongbam 32', 64'; Gogoi 50', 52'; Jangra 71' (pen.); Bag 78'; Gurkirat 90'; Paul 90+3'

Attendance: 500
Referee: W. Lakmal Weerakkody (Sri Lanka)

2 August 2022
16:00

Bangladesh	1–1	Nepal
Nova 63'	Report	Malla 69'

Attendance: 250
Referee: Sinan Hussain (Maldives)
2 August 2022
19:00

India	1–0	Maldives
Gurkirat 90'	Report

Attendance: 550
Referee: Prajwol Chhetri (Nepal)

== Final ==
5 August 2022
19:00 IST

Bangladesh	2–5 (a.e.t.)	India
Howladar 45'; Mia 48'	Report	Gurkirat 2' (pen.), 60', 96', 102'; Jangra 95'

Kalinga Stadium
Attendance: 7642
Referee: Sinan Hussain (Maldives)

Bangladesh U-20	India U-20

GK	1	Asif Bhuiyan (GK)
LB	2	Shahin Mia	48'	(yellow card) 63'
RB	3	Azizul Hoque Ananto
CB	5	Mohammed Imran Khan
CB	6	Tanvir Hossain (c)
LW	7	Rafiqul Islam
RW	9	Piash Ahmed Nova
MF	10	Moinul Islam Moin			(substituted off) 46'
CF	11	Mohammed Nahiyan
MF	14	Akkas Ali			(substituted off) 46'
MF	16	Rajon Howladar	45'		(substituted off) 46'
Substitutions:
FW	19	Sajed Hasan Jummon Nijum			(substituted on) 46'
FW	20	Mirajul Islam			(substituted on) 46'
MF	15	Mojibur Rahman Jony			(substituted on) 46'
Manager:
(England) Paul Smalley

GK	22	Som Kumar (GK)
LB	2	Amandeep Singh		(yellow card) 56'
CB	3	Halen Nongtudu
CB	4	Bikash Yumnam		(yellow card) 94'
MF	6	Sibajit Singh Leimapokpam (c)
CM	7	Vibin Mohanan
LB	9	Gurkirat Singh	2', 60', 93', 99'		(yellow card) 93'
CF	11	Himanshu Jangra	92' (a.e.t)
DM	12	Maheson Singh Tongbram			(substituted off) 57'
CB	17	Brijesh Giri
CF	20	Taison Singh Loitongbam			(substituted off) 85'
Substitutions:
MF	18	Tankadhar Bag			(substituted on) 57'
MF	11	Hitesh Sharma			(substituted on) 73'
FW	19	Harsh Patre			(substituted on) 85'
Manager:
(India) Shanmugam Venkatesh

Assistant referees:
Ahmed Afsah (Maldives)
D.D.I Sendanayaka (Sri Lanka)
Fourth official:
W.L Weerakkody (Sri Lanka)

Match rules:

- 90 minutes
- Extra time if scores remain level after 90 minutes
- Penalty shoot-out if scores still level
- 11 substitutes named

== Winner ==
4th SAFF U-20 Championship 2022

India
Second title

== Goalscorers ==
There were 40 goals scored in 11 matches, for an average of 3.64 goals per match.

8 goals

- (India) Gurkirat Singh

4 goals

- (Bangladesh) Mirajul Islam
- (India) Parthib Sundar Gogoi

3 goals

- (Bangladesh) Piash Ahmed Nova
- (India) Himanshu Jangra

2 goals

- (India) Taison Singh Loitongbam
- (Nepal) Kritish Ratna Chhunju
- (Nepal) Managya Nakarmi

1 goal

- (Bangladesh) Rajon Hawlader
- (Bangladesh) Shahin Mia
- (Bangladesh) Rafiqul Islam
- (India) Tankadhar Bag
- (India) Shubho Paul
- (Maldives) Aiham Hamdoon
- (Maldives) Zain Zafar
- (Nepal) Ayush Ghalan
- (Nepal) Dipesh Gurung
- (Nepal) Niranjan Malla
- (Nepal) Sugam Suwal
- (Sri Lanka) Theshan Thushmika

== See also ==
- 2022 SAFF Women's Championship
- 2022 SAFF U-18 Women's Championship
- 2022 SAFF U-15 Women's Championship
- 2022 SAFF U-17 Championship
