= Punjab Football Association =

Punjab Football Association may refer to:

== Association Football ==
- Punjab Football Association (India)
- Punjab Football Association (Pakistan)
