= Shubho Paul =

Indian footballer (born 2004)

Personal information
- Full name: Shubho Paul
- Date of birth: 4 March 2004 (age 22)
- Place of birth: Salkia, West Bengal
- Height: 1.68 m (5 ft 6 in)
- Position: Striker

Team information
- Current team: Mohun Bagan SG

Youth career
- Bengal Football Academy
- Beleghata Balaka Club
- Sudeva Academy

Senior career*
Years	Team	Apps	(Gls)
2020–2023	Sudeva Delhi	32	(7)
2023	Sudeva Delhi B	6	(3)
2023–	Mohun Bagan SG	0	(0)

International career
2019–2020	India U17	11	(3)
2022–	India U20	4	
- * Club domestic league appearances and goals as of 19:32, 11 March 2023 (UTC)

Shubho Paul (Bengali: শুভ পাল; born 4 March 2004) is an Indian professional footballer who plays as a forward for Indian Super League club Mohun Bagan SG. He was part of the Bayern Munich U19 World Squad.

== Club career ==
=== Youth career ===
==== Sudeva Moonlight Academy ====
He played in the AIFF Youth League for Sudeva Academy. In the 2019–20 season he scored 14 goals in 11 games.

=== Senior career ===
As a result of his stunning performance for the youth team he called up to the senior team of Sudeva Delhi for 2021 season. On 28 February 2021, he scored his maiden goal for the senior team in the 41st minute of a 2–3 loss to TRAU FC. He scored a decision making goal on 20 March 2021 to defeat Indian Arrows at 40th minute.

==== Bayern Munich World Squad ====
In 2021, Paul made it to German giant FC Bayern Munich's World Squad. The World squad included 15 international U19 talents from 15 different nations, who will be trained along with FC Bayern Munich U19 team.

== International career ==
He has been part of Indian U20. In 2021, he played for the U16 team in the AFC U-16 Asian Cup Qualifier where he scored 3 goals in 3 matches. He scored a brace against Bahrain on 20 September 2019. He won 2019 SAFF U-15 Championship in which he scored 4 goals in 5 games for the U15 national side. Later, he was part of the India U20 team that took part in 2023 AFC U-20 Asian Cup qualification.

== Career statistics ==
=== Club ===
As of 11 March 2023

Appearances and goals by club, season and competition
Club	Season	League			Cup		AFC		Total	
Club	Season	Division	Apps	Goals	Apps	Goals	Apps	Goals	Apps	Goals
Sudeva Delhi	2020–21	I-League	8	2	0	0	–		8	2
Sudeva Delhi	2021–22	I-League	14	5	3 (Note: Appearance(s) in Durand Cup)	0	–		17	5
Sudeva Delhi	2022–23	I-League	10	0	0	0	–		10	0
Sudeva Delhi	Sudeva Delhi total		32	7	3	0	0	0	35	7
Career total			32	7	3	0	0	0	35	7

== Honours ==
India U-15

- U-15 SAFF Championship: 2019

India U-20

- SAFF U-20 Championship: 2022
