= Shadi Al Hamwi =

Syrian footballer (born 1995)

Personal information
- Full name: Shadi Rateb Al Hamwi
- Date of birth: 8 August 1995 (age 31)
- Place of birth: Homs, Syria
- Height: 1.85 m (6 ft 1 in)
- Position: Forward

Team information
- Current team: Al-Najaf

Youth career
- 2011–2012: Al-Karamah

Senior career*
| Years | Team | Apps | (Gls) |
| 2012–2013 | Al-Faisaly | | |
| 2013–2014 | Al-Karmel | | |
| 2015–2016 | Al-Yarmouk | | |
| 2016–2017 | Shabab Al-Aqaba | | |
| 2017–2018 | Al-Jazeera | | |
| 2018–2019 | Al-Ramtha | | |
| 2019–2020 | Najran | | |
| 2020 | Manama | | |
| 2020–2021 | Al-Najaf | 7 | (2) |
| 2021–2022 | Al-Karamah | 21 | (3) |

International career^{‡}
| 2017–2018 | Syria U23 | | |
| 2019– | Syria | 5 | (2) |
- * Club domestic league appearances and goals as of 9 February 2020 ‡ National team caps and goals as of 24 September 2017

Shadi Al Hamwi (Arabic: شادي الحموي; born 8 August 1995) is a Syrian footballer who plays for Al-Karamah in the Syrian Premier League and for the Syrian national team.

== International career ==
Al Hamwi made his first senior appearance for Syria on 10 October 2019, in the 2022 FIFA World Cup qualification against Maldives.

== Honours ==
Al-Jazeera

- Jordanian Pro League runner-up: 2017–18
- Jordan FA Cup: 2017–18
