= ARA FC =

Indian association football club based in Ahmedabad

ARA
- Full name: Ahmedabad Racquet Academy Football Club
- Nicknames: The Alphas, Ahmedabad Alphas
- Short name: ARA
- Founded: 2016; 10 years ago
- Ground: EKA Arena
- Capacity: 20,000
- Owner: Vikram Patel
- Head coach: Salim Pathan
- League: I-League 2 Gujarat SFA Club Championship
- Website: www.racquetacademy.in/football
Home colours	Away colours

ARA Football Club is an Indian professional football club based in Ahmedabad, Gujarat. Founded in 2016, the club is nicknamed "Ahmedabad Alphas", and previously competed in I-League 2nd Division. ARA FC is the first professional team from Gujarat to compete in the nationwide league. The club also competes in Gujarat SFA Club Championship.

Their reserve and youth teams play in both Hero Sub-Junior League and Hero Elite League, while the women's team is a member of Indian Women's League.

== History ==
=== Academy and early years ===
Ahmedabad Racquet Academy (ARA) started its journey as a professional multi-sports academy in Ahmedabad, Gujarat, which mainly consists of racquet sports and has been running since 2011 and began participating in Ahmedabad Junior league. The football club was among the newest projects established by the academy in recent times as an initiative by owner Vikram Patel.

=== Formation of club ===
The existing academy owned by Patel emerged as ARA FC in 2016 to ensure development of football in the Indian state of Gujarat. On 19 July 2018, their academy were accredited and given two stars based on eligibility criteria, which allowed them to play in Youth League U18. ARA as a club became affiliated with Gujarat State Football Association (GSFA) in 2017, and began competing in the ADFA Premier Division League.

=== 2018–present ===
On 20 November 2018, AIFF nominated ARA for proposed inclusion in the 2018–19 2nd Division League. On 7 December, it was announced that ARA FC would be one of nine clubs to play that season. Thus the Ahmedabad-based club became the only team from the state competing in a domestic tier league.

In their maiden I-League 2nd Division in the 2018–19 season, ARA finished in fourth place in Group A with 11 points in 8 matches as Lonestar Kashmir progressed to the final round.

They were nominated for participating in the 2021 I-League Qualifiers, by virtue of emerging victorious in Gandhinagar Premier League. They began their journey with a 1–1 draw against Corbett FC on 5 October at the Bangalore Football Stadium but did not advanced to the final round. In February–March 2023, the club participated in Stafford Challenge Cup in Bangalore. In August 2023, ARA gained I-League 3 spot to compete in the inaugural edition.

== Home stadium ==
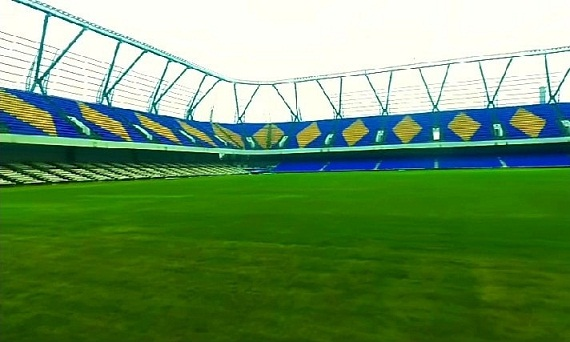
EKA Arena by TransStadia, home ground of ARA

ARA FC plays its home matches at the EKA Arena, which has a capacity of 20,000 spectators. The stadium is located in Kankaria Lake, Ahmedabad, and has additional 10,000 temporary seats on the pitch area.

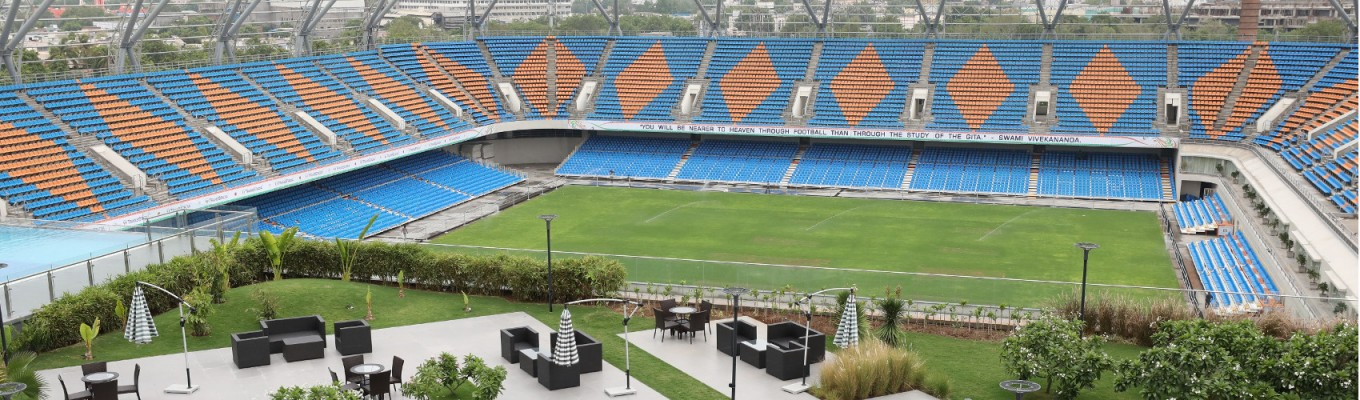
Panoramic view of the stadium

== Kit manufacturers and shirt sponsors ==
Period	Kit manufacturer	Shirt sponsor
2018–2021	SEVEN	Amul
2021–present	Decathlon Sports	

== Current squad ==
As of 13 March 2023

Note: Flags indicate national team as defined under FIFA eligibility rules; some limited exceptions apply. Players may hold more than one non-FIFA nationality.

No.	Pos.	Nation	Player
1	GK	IND	sangramjith Roy
2	DF	IND	Daniel
3	DF	IND	Surajit Seal
5	FW	IND	Vivekananda Sagayaraj
6	MF	IND	Hijam Lenin Singh
7	FW	IND	Manvir Singh
8	MF	IND	Rutig Ahirrao
9	FW	IND	Fredsan Marshall
11	DF	IND	Jacob John
12	DF	IND	Shanid Valan
13	DF	IND	Parnenda Singh Thakur
14	MF	IND	D Sheltohn Paul
15	MF	IND	Lalthankuma
16	MF	IND	Pratik Swami

No.	Pos.	Nation	Player
17	MF	IND	Aditya Prathap
18	MF	IND	Vedant Kharkrwal
19	MF	IND	Prabin Tigga
20	FW	IND	Lalruatmawia
21	GK	IND	Vishal Rajkumar Dube
23	MF	IND	Khaidem Vicky Meitei
24	DF	IND	Rakesh Oram
25	FW	IND	Jay Kanani
27	DF	IND	Palash Barber
28	MF	IND	Bikramjit Singh
30	DF	IND	Jenishsinh Rana
31	GK	IND	Ankit Bhuyan
33	MF	IND	Yami Longvah

== Current technical staff ==
As of 12 November 2019

Position	Name
Team manager	(India) Marmik Pandya
Head coach	(India) Vivek Nagul
Assistant coach	(India) Salim Pathan
Physio	(India) Falgun Bhatt

== Honours ==
=== League ===
- Gujarat SFA Club Championship
  - Champions (2): 2022, 2025
- ADFA Ahmedabad District League 2nd Division
  - Champions (1): 2017
- ADFA Ahmedabad District League 1st Division
  - Champions (2): 2018, 2021–22
- Gandhinagar Premier League
  - Champions (1): 2020–21

=== Cup ===
- Heritage Cup Jaipur
  - Champions (1): 2020

== Records ==
Season	Div.	Tms.	Pos.	Attendance/G	Federation Cup/Super Cup	AFC Champions League	AFC Cup
2018–19	IL2	16	G4th	650	DNP	DNP	DNP
2019–20	IL2	18	Final round 4th	–	DNP	DNP	DNP

Key

- Tms. = Number of teams
- Pos. = Position in league
- Attendance/G = Average league attendance

=== Managerial record ===
updated on 25 October 2020

Name	Nationality	From	To	P	W	D	L	GF	GA	Win%
Vivek Nagul	India	2018	2021	19	7	4	8	28	29	36.84
Manuel Retamero Fraile	Spain	2021		0	0	0	0	0	0	—

== Notable players ==
For current and former notable ARA FC players with a Wikipedia article, see: ARA FC players.

== Other departments ==
=== Women's team ===
ARA FC has its women's football team that competes in the Indian Women's League, the highest division of Indian women's football. Before the kick-off of 2021–22 Indian Women's League season, four teams including ARA Women from four states played each other once in April 2022, in the qualifying round at the Ambedkar Stadium in New Delhi and they qualified for the final round after topping the group.

Honours

- Gujarat State Women's League
  - Champions (1): 2021–22
  - Third place (1): 2022–23

=== Youth men's ===
Youth men's team of ARA competes in the Ahmedabad Elite Youth Cup Ahmedabad. Club's U17 team participated in "regional group stages" of 2022–23 U-17 Youth Cup.

=== Football academy ===
Football Academy of ARA FC gained 'elite category' accreditation by the All India Football Federation in December 2023.

== See also ==
- List of football clubs in India
