= EKA Arena =

Building in India

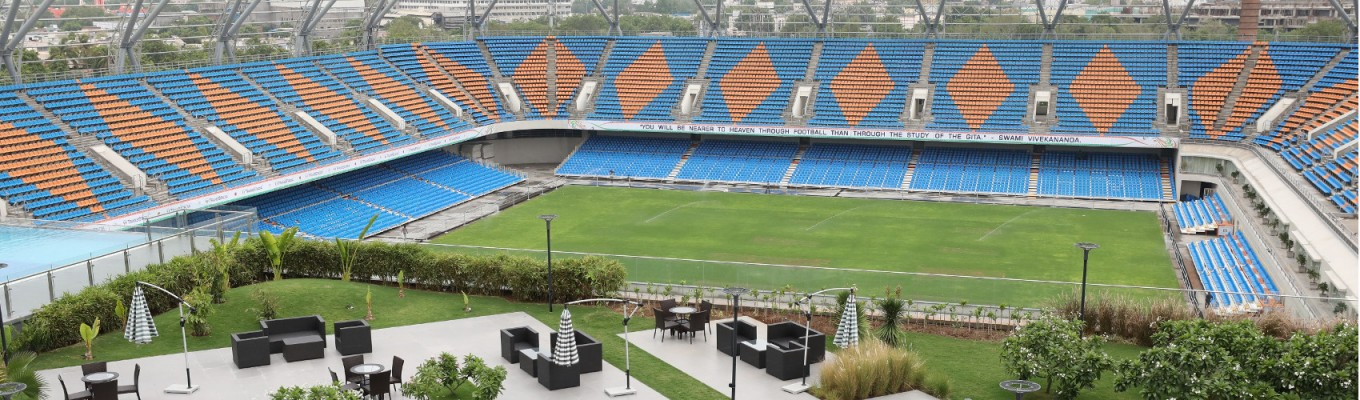
- Panoramic view of the stadium
- Interactive map of EKA Arena
- Full name: EKA Arena by TransStadia
- Address: India
- Location: Kankaria Lake, Ahmedabad, Gujarat
- Coordinates: 23°00′39.7″N 72°35′56.8″E
- Owner: TransStadia
- Capacity: 20,000 (10,000 more with temporary seats on the pitch area) (outdoor)
- Surface: Bermuda Grass
- Field size: 105 m × 68 m (344 ft × 223 ft)
- Public transit: Janmarg; AMTS

Construction
- Opened: 7 October 2016
- Cost: US$ 82.15 million
- Architects: Holmes Miller & DSP Design Associates

Tenants
- India national football team (2019–present); ARA F.C. Gujarat football team Gujarat Giants

Website
- transstadia.com

EKA Arena (formerly The Arena by TransStadia) is a multi-purpose stadium in Ahmedabad, Gujarat, located near Kankaria Lake. The stadium was officially opened on 7 October 2016. It was built in a public-private partnership between the Government of Gujarat and SE TransStadia, a company led by entrepreneur Udit Sheth.

The stadium seats 20,000 spectators in its main football configuration. It is capable of being partitioned into an indoor arena, allowing it to host other sporting events (such as kabaddi and table tennis).

== History ==
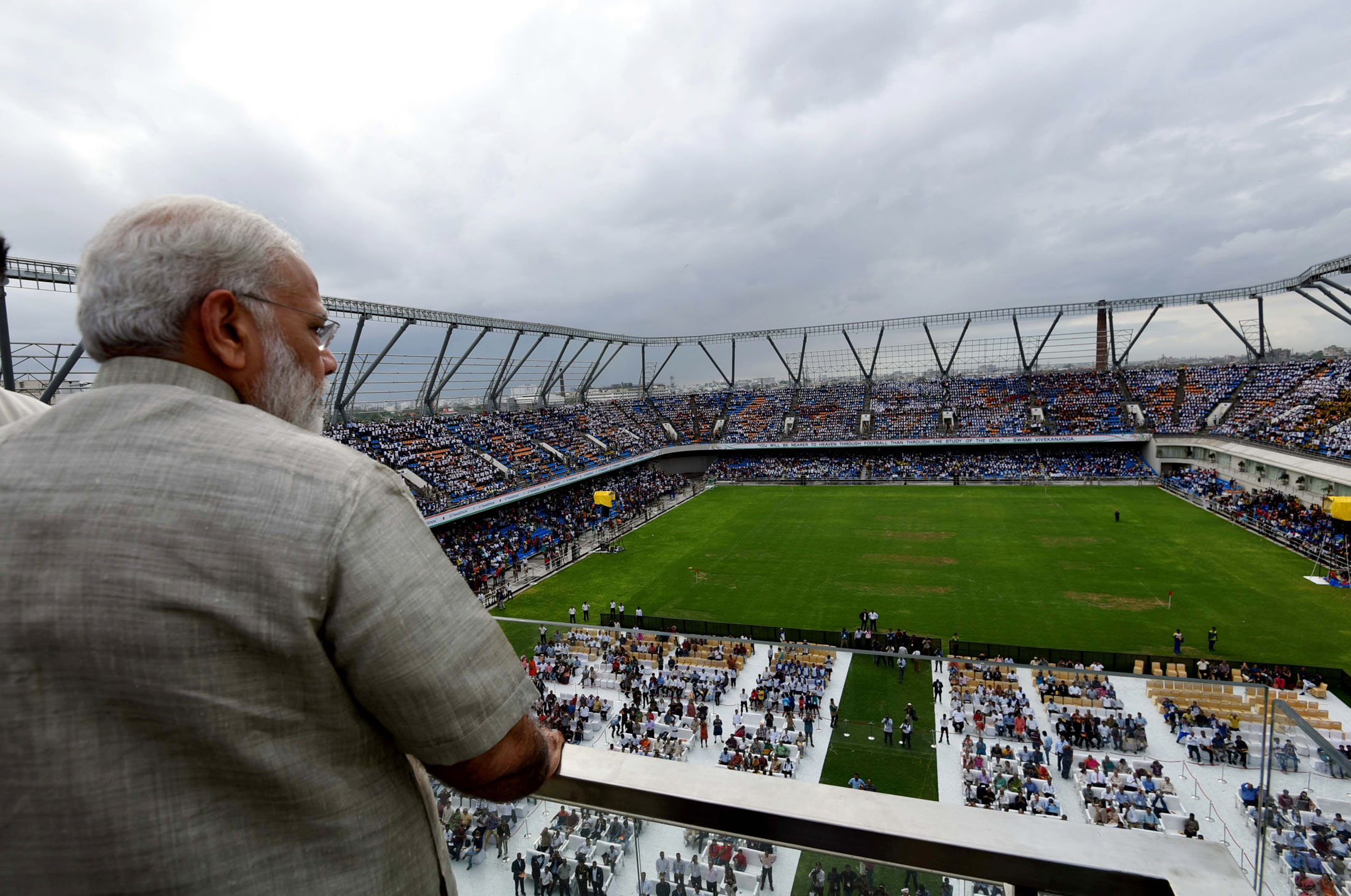
Prime Minister Narendra Modi at the inauguration ceremony of the stadium in Ahmedabad, June 30, 2017.

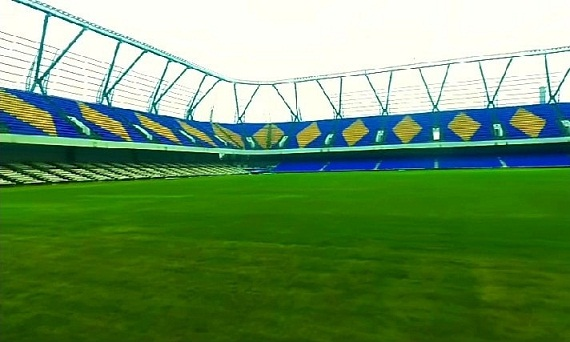
Interior of the stadium

TransStadia was established by entrepreneur Udit Sheth after being introduced to British footballer and stadium consultant Paul Fletcher. Sheth sought to build a multi-purpose stadium on an otherwise-unused property in Gujarat, licensing technology from Fletcher's company StadiArena to allow part of the facility to be converted into an indoor arena to maximise its utilisation.

Sheth stated that the design of the stadium and its facilities were intended to meet the needs of players, spectators, and broadcasters, including training facilities, ensuring there were no obstructed views and adequate fibreoptic connections for Wi-Fi, and working with Star Sports officials to plan the necessary infrastructure for broadcasting. He cited Amsterdam Arena, the Tokyo Dome, and Wembley Stadium as influences on its overall design.

The facility cost ₹550 crore to construct, as part of a public-private partnership with the state government; Sheth explained that "the project would not have been viable if we decided to charge commercial market value rent and still expected sports to develop. A regular project will recover money in around five years while we will do it in seven to nine years."

Its indoor arena hosted its facility's first sporting event — the 2016 Kabaddi World Cup—in November 2016. A formal inauguration ceremony was held 30 June 2017, attended by Prime Minister Narendra Modi and other political and sporting dignitaries. During a speech at the ceremony, Sheth referred to The Arena as "the most modern stadium in the world".

== Major events ==
=== Kabaddi ===
The Arena hosted the Kabaddi World Cup in 2016. It has hosted legs of the Pro Kabaddi League, serving as designated home arena of the Gujarat Giants.

=== Football ===
In July 2019, the stadium hosted the 2019 Intercontinental Cup, marking the first international football matches held at the Arena.

It was to host matches during the 2020 FIFA U-17 Women's World Cup, but the tournament was postponed due to the COVID-19 pandemic. India were awarded the 2022 tournament, but Ahmedabad was not named a host city.

It hosted football during the 2022 National Games of India.

=== Other ===
On October 11, 2025 the 70th Filmfare awards were hosted at the Arena.

== See also ==
- List of football stadiums in India
