= Football in India =

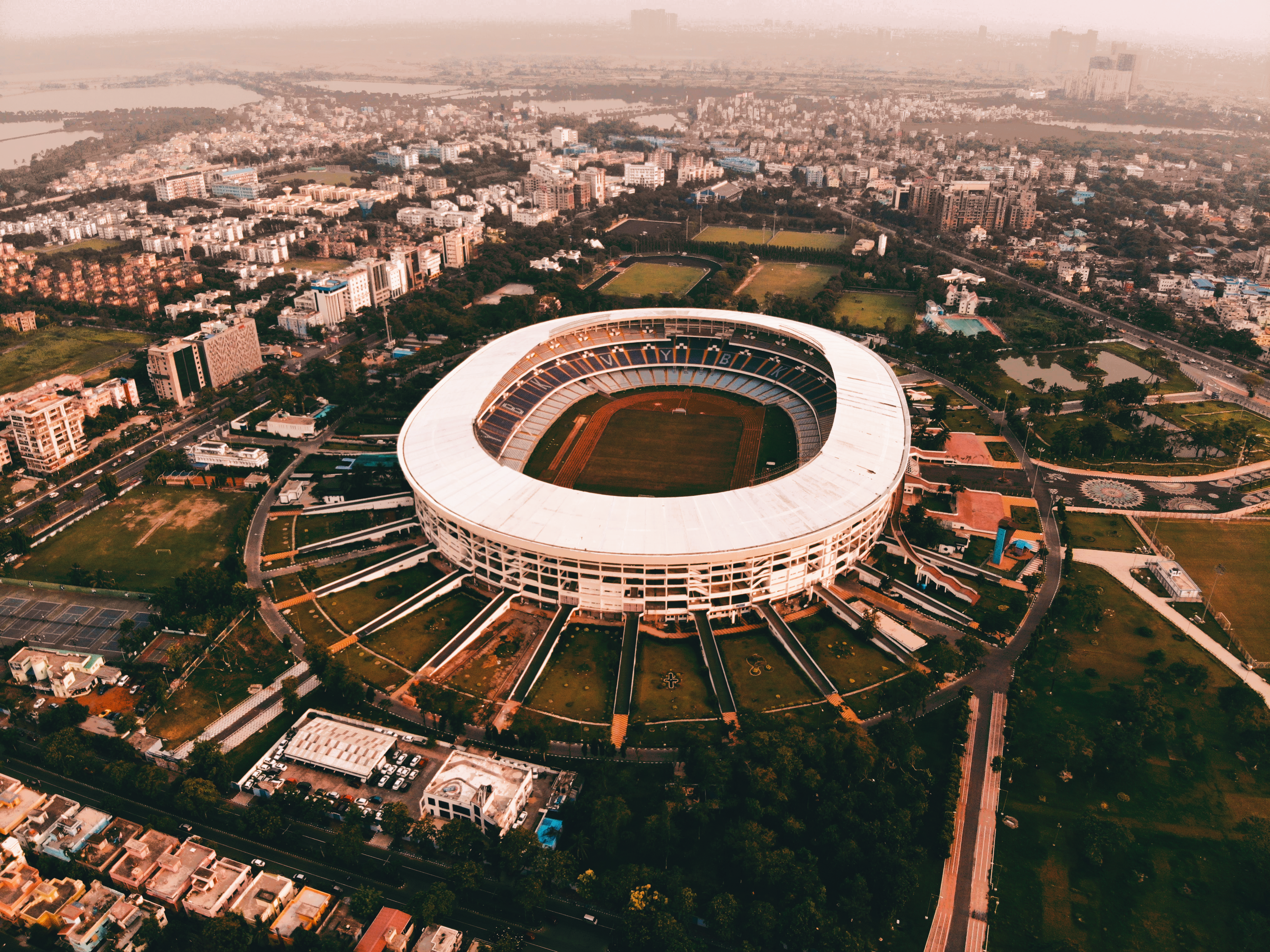
- Salt Lake Stadium in Kolkata, West Bengal
- Country: India
- Governing body: All India Football Federation (AIFF) (formed in 1937, joined FIFA in 1948)
- National teams: India men's India women's India U-23 men's India U-20 men's India U-20 women's India U-17 men's India U-17 women's India futsal men's India futsal women's India beach soccer men's India Esports
- Nickname: The Blue Tigers/Tigresses
- First played: 1800s

National competitions
- List: Senior Football Championship: Senior Men's National Football Championship; Senior Women's National Football Championship; National Beach Soccer Championship; U23 Football Championships; National Games Football; U21 Football Championships; Swami Vivekananda National Football Championship (U20); Khelo India Youth Games (U-21); U19 Football Championships; Junior Girl's National Football Championship; U17 Football Championships; Junior Boy's National Football Championship; Sub-Junior Boy's National Football championship; Sub–Junior Girl's National Football Championship; Khelo India Youth Games (U-17); University Football Championship: Khelo India University Games; Inter-School Football Championships; Subroto Cup

Club competitions
- List: Leagues: Men's; Indian Super League (1st tier); Indian Football League (2nd tier); I-League 2 (3rd tier); I-League 3 (4th tier); State leagues (5th - 9th tier); AIFF Futsal Club Championship; Youth League; Women's; Indian Women's League (1st tier); Indian Women's League 2 (2nd tier); State leagues (3rd tier); Institutional League; Cups: Federation Cup; Durand Cup

International competitions
- List: Clubs; AFC Champions League Elite; AFC Champions League Two; SAFF Club Championship; SAFF Club Women's Championship; AFC Women's Champions League; AFC Futsal Club Championship; National team; FIFA World Cup: Qualified (1950) Did not participate; Summer Olympics: Semi-finals (1956); AFC Asian Cup: Runners-up (1964); Asian Games: Champions (1951, 1962); South Asian Games: Champions (1985, 1987, 1995); SAFF Championship: Champions (1993, 1997, 1999, 2005, 2009, 2011, 2015, 2021, 2023); Intercontinental Cup (India): Champions (2018, 2023); Tri-Nation Series: Champions (2017, 2023); Defunct; AFC Challenge Cup: Champions (2008); Nehru Cup: Champions (2007, 2009, 2012); National U-23 team; Asian Games: Round of 16 (2014, 2022); South Asian Games: Runners–up (2004, 2016); National U-20 team; AFC U-20 Asian Cup: Champions (1974); SAFF U-20 Championship: Champions (2019, 2022, 2023); National U-17 team; FIFA U-17 World Cup: Group stage (2017); AFC U-17 Asian Cup: Quarter-finals (2002, 2018); SAFF U-17 Championship: Champions (2013, 2017, 2019, 2022, 2023); WAFF U-16 Championship: Runners-up (2018); National futsal team; 2022 AFC Futsal Asian Cup; National beach soccer team; AFC Beach Soccer Asian Cup: Group stage (2007); Asian Beach Games: Group stage (2008); Women's national team; AFC Women's Asian Cup: Runners-up (1979, 1983); Asian Games: Group Stage (1998, 2014, 2022); SAFF Women's Championship: Champions (2010, 2012, 2014, 2016, 2019); South Asian Games: Champions (2010, 2016, 2019); Women's U-20 national team; AFC U-20 Women's Asian Cup: Quarter-finals (2004); SAFF U-20 Women's Championship: Champions (2022, 2024); Women's U-17 national team; FIFA U-17 Women's World Cup: Group Stage (2022); AFC U-17 Women's Asian Cup: Group Stage (2005); SAFF U-17 Women's Championship: Champions (2018, 2019)

Audience records
- Single match: 131,781 (1997 Federation Cup semifinal at Salt Lake Stadium)

Association football is a highly popular sport in India, next to cricket and Kabaddi. According to a 2024 survey, 305 million Indians, 21% of the population, are considered as football fans. It is the dominant sport in the states of Assam, Goa, Karnataka, Tamil Nadu, Kerala, Manipur, Meghalaya, Nagaland, and West Bengal.

The 2017 FIFA U-17 World Cup was the first FIFA event the country hosted. It was called the most successful FIFA U-17 World Cup ever, with a record-breaking attendance of 1,347,133, exceeding China's record of 1,230,976 from 1985. India also hosted the 2022 FIFA U-17 Women's World Cup and bid to host the 2019 FIFA U-20 World Cup.

The Indian national football team qualified for the 1950 FIFA World Cup but did not participate.

== History ==
=== Pre-independence ===
British soldiers introduced football into India in the mid-nineteenth century. Games were initially played between army teams but clubs were soon set up around the country. In 1872, Calcutta FC was the first football club to be established, though the side may have originated as a rugby club that switched codes as late as 1894. Other early clubs include Dalhousie AC, Traders Club and Naval Volunteers Club. Several other football clubs such as Sovabazar, Mohun Bagan and Aryan Club were established in Calcutta in the 1890s. Calcutta was then the capital of British India and soon became the hub of football. Tournaments like the Gladstone Cup, the Trades Cup and the Cooch Behar Cup were started around this time. The Durand Cup and IFA Shield were both started in the late nineteenth century.

The first Indian team to achieve success was Sovabazar Club, which won the Trades Cup in 1892. Mohun Bagan Athletic Club, which was set up in modern-day West Bengal in 1889, became famous in 1911 when it became the first Indian team to win the IFA Shield, a tournament previously won only by British teams based in India. They defeated East Yorkshire Regiment 2–1 in the tournament's final in a victory that is still regarded as one of the greatest win by an Indian football team before independence.

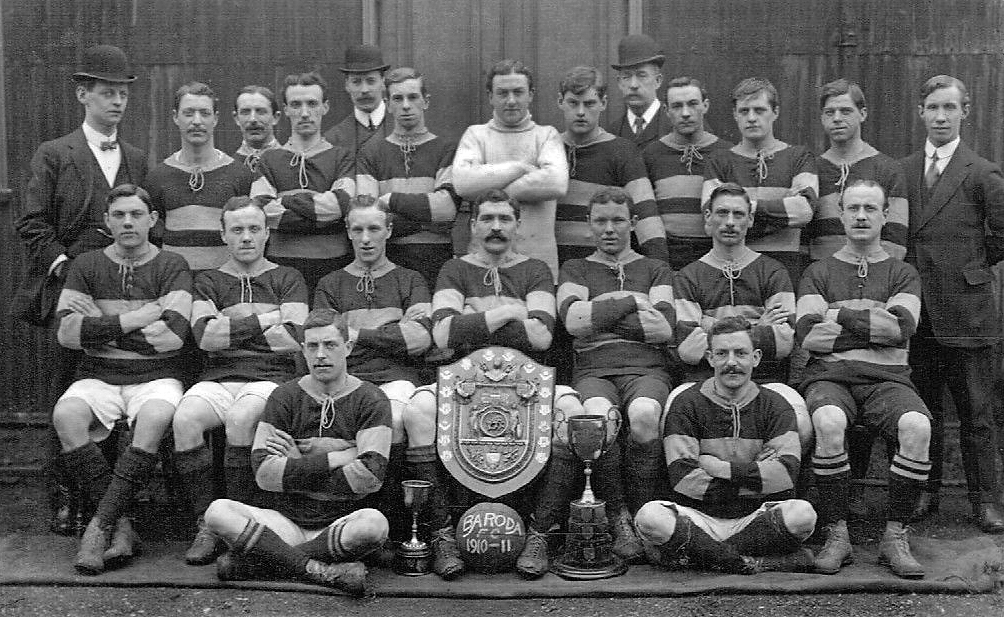
Players of Baroda Football Club, an Indian-European team, 1910–11.

The Indian Football Association (IFA) was established in Calcutta in 1893 but had no Indians on its board until the 1930s. The All India Football Federation (AIFF), the national governing body of football in India, was formed in 1937 but did not become affiliated with FIFA until at least a decade later. India insisted on playing barefoot whereas other national sides wore boots. Footballer Jyotish Chandra Guha brought global attention to Indian football when he became the first Indian to appear with the English Football League club Arsenal in 1930.

=== The golden age ===
India qualified by default for the 1950 FIFA World Cup in Brazil because all of their scheduled opponents withdrew. India did not compete in the tournament. It was not because of a lack of financial assistance, particularly to purchase tickets for the sea journey, or because the team were not allowed to play barefoot. According to sports journalist Jaydeep Basu, the financial barrier was solved as state associations provided financial help to the AIFF and that FIFA also promised to provide money.

FIFA had imposed a rule banning barefoot play following the 1948 Olympics where India had played barefoot. According to then-captain Shailen Manna, this story was circulated to justify the AIFF's decision to not participate. Since 1950, the Indian national team has not come close to qualifying for the World Cup. The AIFF had organised training is Calcutta for the 1950 World Cup and the board organised a series of meetings relating to India's participation but was not able to reach a decision. One to two weeks before the World Cup, the AIFF resorted to coming up with excuses to abandon the World Cup trip. This did not face much criticism in 1948 because the FIFA World Cup was not as popular as it is now.

1951–1962 is widely considered the "golden age" of Indian football. Until the mid‑1960s, India was one of Asia’s top three football teams. In this period, the national team won numerous titles under the coaching of Syed Abdul Rahim. India won the gold medal in the first Asian Games in 1951, beating Iran by one goal. In 1956, no longer playing barefoot, India reached the semi-final in the 1956 Melbourne Olympics, becoming the first Asian country to do so and ranking fourth in the tournament. In 1962, India again won the gold in the Asian Games at Jakarta, defeating South Korea 2–1. India also won the Merdeka Cup and the Asian Quadrangular Football Tournament, while East Bengal garnered good reviews after touring Romania. Also in 1951, India achieved their highest World Football Elo Rating of 31. According to former FIFA president Sepp Blatter, India is "The sleeping giant of world football".

=== Decline ===
Rahim's death in the year 1963 on 11 June, caused the Indian national team to gradually lose their position as a top Asian team. India has not qualified for the Olympics since 1960. India qualified for their first Asian Cup in 1964 but failed to win the title. In an international tournament at the 1970 Asian Games, India won the bronze medal after defeating Japan 1–0. The Indian national team qualified for the 1984 AFC Asian Cup for the first time since 1964 but failed to qualify for the knockout stage after finishing last in their group of five teams.

The Indian youth team jointly won the Youth Asian Cup with Iran in 1974, the first and only title for India at the youth level. In club football, on 24 September 1977, Mohun Bagan held onto a 2–2 draw at the Eden Gardens stadium in Calcutta, against a Pelé-led New York Cosmos. Mohun Bagan would have won the tie had it not been for a controversial penalty awarded to the visiting team that ensured the draw. The next day, the newspaper Ananda Bazar Patrika described Goutam Sarkar as "India's very own Beckenbauer".

The Indian women's team as they began playing in the 1970s. In 1975, their first manager was Sushil Bhattacharya. The Indian women's team were runners-up in the AFC Women's Asian Cup in 1980 and 1983. In the 1990s, the women's team rapidly declined and a series of defeats followed. In 2009, FIFA delisted the Indian women's team from the world rankings.

=== 2007–present ===
In August 2007, the Indian national team won the Nehru Cup for the first time, beating Syria 1–0. In August of the following year, India defeated Tajikistan 4–1 to win the AFC Challenge Cup and qualified for the 2011 AFC Asian Cup in Qatar. In August 2009, India again won the Nehru Cup, beating Syria on penalties (6–5).

In January 2011, India played in the 2011 Asian Cup, the country's first Asian Cup for 24 years. India was eliminated in the group stage, which included South Korea, Australia, and Bahrain.

Since the 2011 Asian Cup, the All India Football Federation (AIFF) has been working to improve Indian football. They allowed former coach Bob Houghton to coach the Indian team in the 2012 AFC Challenge Cup qualifiers. After going first in their AFC Challenge Cup group, Houghton was replaced by Wim Koevermans. The India national under-23 football team won the first round of the 2012 Olympics qualifiers against Myanmar but were eliminated by Qatar. India played their next official matches against United Arab Emirates in the 2014 FIFA World Cup qualifiers, which India lost on aggregate 5–2.

In 2014, India hosted the first Unity World Cup in Goa, Hyderabad and Bangalore. India has participated in and hosted the 2017 FIFA U-17 World Cup tournament. This was the first time a team representing India participated in the finals of a FIFA-organised world tournament. India was placed in Group A along with the United States, Ghana and Colombia. On 6 October 2017, India played their first match in the FIFA U-17 World Cup in front of 47,000 people against the United States, losing the match 0–3. India played their second match against Colombia. In the 82nd minute, Jeakson Singh became the first Indian goal scorer in the finals of a FIFA-organised tournament. For the third match of the group stage, India played Ghana, losing the match 4–0 and finishing at the bottom of Group A.

In 2018 Indian youth football teams made history by defeating Argentina U-20 2–1 in the COTIF cup, as well as Iraq U-16, the defending champions of the AFC U-16 Championship (now the AFC U-17 Championship), by 1–0. The U-16 team qualified for the 2018 AFC U-16 Championship, where they came close to qualifying for the 2019 FIFA U-17 World Cup, but lost to South Korea by a single goal in the quarterfinal.

The Indian national team qualified for the 2019 AFC Asian Cup after missing the 2015 edition. India beat Thailand by 4–1, their biggest-ever win at the Asia Cup and their first win in 55 years. Nevertheless, they lost both of their next two group matches against UAE and Bahrain by 0−2 and 0−1 respectively and finished at the bottom of the group, thus failing to move to the knockout stage.

== Administration ==
Football in India is administered by the All India Football Federation (AIFF), which is affiliated with the Asian Football Confederation (AFC) and the worldwide football governing body FIFA. The India national football team has entered the regional Asian Cup competition but has never competed in a World Cup. The India women's national football team has also played in competitions, and has its own inter-state and state competitions. Youth football is administered by the Sports Authority of India.

== National team ==
The India national football team is governed by the AIFF and is a member of the Asian Football Confederation. Since 1948, the AIFF has been affiliated with FIFA, the international governing body for world football. In 1954, the AIFF became one of the founding members of the AFC. There are other Indian national teams, such as the under-23 team and the under-17 team.

The following list includes the performance of all of India's national teams at major competitions.

=== Men's senior team ===
The Indian senior national team had several successes during their initial years, but is no longer considered one of the best in Asia. The national team's highest achievement is winning two gold medals at the Asian Games.

| Tournament | Appearance in finals | Last appearance | Best performance |
|---|---|---|---|
| FIFA World Cup | 0 out of 22 | — | – |
| AFC Asian Cup | 1 out of 18 | 2023 | Runners-up (1964) |
| Summer Olympics | 0 | 1960 | Fourth-place (1956) |
| Asian Games | 2 | 1998 | Champions (1951, 1962) |
| SAFF Championship | 13 | 2023 | Champions (1993, 1997, 1999, 2005, 2009, 2011, 2015, 2021, 2023) |
| South Asian Games | 4 | 1999 | Champions (1985, 1987, 1995) |

=== Women's senior team ===
The women's national team was started in the 1970s; they were twice runners-up in the Women's Asian Cup in the early 1980s. After the AIFF took charge of the team, they began to suffer massive defeats and declined in the late 2000s. In the late 2010s, the AIFF revived the team to empower women's football. The AIFF won the hosting bid for the 2022 AFC Women's Asian Cup.

| Tournament | Appearance in finals | Last appearance | Best performance |
|---|---|---|---|
| AFC Women's Asian Cup | 2 | 2022 | Runners-up (1980, 1983) |
| Asian Games | 0 | 2022 | Eighth-place (1998) |
| SAFF Women's Championship | 5 | 2024 | Champions (2010, 2012, 2014, 2016, 2019) |
| South Asian Games | 3 out of 3 | 2019 | Champions (2010, 2016, 2019) |

=== Men's U-23 team ===
| Tournament | Appearance in finals | Last appearance | Best performance |
|---|---|---|---|
| Asian Games | 0 | 2022 | Ninth-place (2022) |
| South Asian Games | 2 | 2016 | Runners-up (2004, 2016) |

=== Men's U-20 team ===
Includes U-19 and U-18 teams' performance.

| Tournament | Appearance in finals | Last appearance | Best performance |
|---|---|---|---|
| AFC U-20 Asian Cup | 1 | 2006 | Champions (1974) |
| SAFF U-20 Championship | 4 | 2024 | Champions (2019, 2022, 2023) |

=== Men's U-17 team ===
Includes U-16 and U-15 teams' performance.

| Tournament | Finals appearance | Last appearance | Best performance |
|---|---|---|---|
| FIFA U-17 World Cup | 1 | 2017 | Group stage (2017) |
| AFC U-17 Asian Cup | 3 | 2023 | Quarterfinals (2002, 2018) |
| SAFF U-17 Championship | 8 | 2024 | Champions (2013, 2017, 2019, 2022, 2024) |

=== Women's U-20 team ===
Includes U-19 and U-18 teams' performance.

| Tournament | Finals appearance | Last appearance | Best performance |
|---|---|---|---|
| AFC U-20 Women's Asian Cup | 2 | 2006 | Quarterfinals (2004) |
| SAFF U-20 Women's Championship | 4 | 2026 | Champions (2022, 2024, 2026) |

=== Women's U-17 team ===
Includes U-16 and U-15 teams' performance.

| Tournament | Finals appearance | Last appearance | Best performance |
|---|---|---|---|
| FIFA U-17 Women's World Cup | 1 | 2022 | Group stage (2022) |
| AFC U-17 Women's Asian Cup | 1 | 2005 | Group stage (2005) |
| SAFF U-17 Women's Championship | 5 | 2025 | Champions (2018, 2019, 2025) |

== State federations and leagues ==
There are currently 36 state associations and 2 affiliates associations with the All India Football Federation.

=== Full members ===
| No. | Association | State/UT | President |
|---|---|---|---|
| 1 | All Manipur Football Association | Manipur | M. Ratan Kumar Singh |
| 2 | Andaman and Nicobar Football Association | Andaman and Nicobar Islands | Vidya Prakash Krishna |
| 3 | Andhra Pradesh Football Association | Andhra Pradesh | Gopalakrishna Kosaraju |
| 4 | Arunachal Pradesh Football Association | Arunachal Pradesh | Pema Khandu |
| 5 | Assam Football Association | Assam | Naba Kumar Doley |
| 6 | Bihar Football Association | Bihar | Prasenjeet Mehta |
| 7 | Chandigarh Football Association | Chandigarh | K. P. Singh |
| 8 | Chhattisgarh Football Association | Chhattisgarh | Ajay Chandrakar |
| 9 | Dadra & Nagar Haveli and Daman & Diu Football Association | Dadra & Nagar Haveli and Daman & Diu | |
| 10 | Football Association of Odisha | Odisha | Debashish Samantaray |
| 11 | Football Delhi | Delhi | Saraftullah (acting) |
| 12 | Goa Football Association | Goa | Caitano Fernandes |
| 13 | Gujarat State Football Association | Gujarat | Parimal Nathwani |
| 14 | Haryana Football Association | Haryana | Suraj Pal |
| 15 | Himachal Pradesh Football Association | Himachal Pradesh | Baldev Singh Tomar |
| 16 | Indian Football Association | West Bengal | Ajit Banerjee |
| 17 | Jammu and Kashmir Football Association | Jammu and Kashmir | Wasim Aslam |
| 18 | Jharkhand Football Association | Jharkhand | Mithlesh Kumar Thakur |
| 19 | Karnataka State Football Association | Karnataka | N. A. Haris |
| 20 | Kerala Football Association | Kerala | Tom Jose |
| 21 | Ladakh Football Association | Ladakh | Tashi Namgail |
| 22 | Lakshadweep Football Association | Lakshadweep | K. Mohammed Ali |
| 23 | Madhya Pradesh Football Association | Madhya Pradesh | Trilok Chand Kochar |
| 24 | Meghalaya Football Association | Meghalaya | Larsing Ming Sawyan |
| 25 | Mizoram Football Association | Mizoram | Lal Thanzara |
| 26 | Nagaland Football Association | Nagaland | Neibou Sekhose |
| 27 | Pondicherry Football Association | Puducherry | D. Nestor |
| 28 | Punjab Football Association | Punjab | Samir Thapar |
| 29 | Rajasthan Football Association | Rajasthan | Manvendra Singh |
| 30 | Sikkim Football Association | Sikkim | Menla Ethenpa |
| 31 | Tamil Nadu Football Association | Tamil Nadu | Jesiah Villavarayar |
| 32 | Telangana Football Association | Telangana | Mohammed Ali Rafath |
| 33 | Tripura Football Association | Tripura | Ratan Saha |
| 34 | Uttar Pradesh Football Sangh | Uttar Pradesh | Arvind Menon |
| 35 | Uttarakhand State Football Association | Uttarakhand | Amandeep Sandhu |
| 36 | Western India Football Association | Maharashtra | Praful Patel |

=== Affiliate members ===
| No. | Association | Department | President |
|---|---|---|---|
| 1 | Railways Sports Promotion Board | Indian Railways | D. K. Gayen |
| 2 | Services Sports Control Board | Indian Armed Forces | Dinesh Suri |

=== State Leagues list ===
State Leagues
| No. | State | Men's | Women's |
|---|---|---|---|
| 1 | Andhra Pradesh | AP Super Cup | - |
| 2 | Assam | Assam State Premier League | Assam Women's League |
| 3 | Arunachal Pradesh | Indrajit Namchoom Arunachal League | Arunachal Women's Football Championship |
| 4 | Bihar | Bihar Soccer League | Bihar State Women's League |
| 5 | Chhattisgarh | Chhattisgarh State Men's Football League Championship | Chhattisgarh State Women's Football League |
| 6 | Dadra and Nagar Haveli and Daman and Diu | Dadra & Nagar Haveli Senior Division League and Daman and Diu Senior Division League | - |
| 7 | Delhi | Delhi Football League | Delhi Women's League |
| 8 | Goa | Goa Football League | Goa Women's League |
| 9 | Gujarat | Gujarat SFA Club Championship | Gujarat State Women's League |
| 10 | Haryana | Haryana Men's Football League | Haryana Women's Football League |
| 11 | Himachal Pradesh | Himachal Football League | Himachal Women's League |
| 12 | Jammu and Kashmir | Jammu and Kashmir Premier Football League | - |
| 13 | Jharkhand | JSA League | JSA Women's League |
| 14 | Kerala | Kerala Premier League | Kerala Women's League |
| 15 | Karnataka | Bangalore Football League | Karnataka Women's League |
| 16 | Ladakh | Ladakh Super League | - |
| 17 | Lakshadweep | Kavaratti League | - |
| 18 | Madhya Pradesh | Madhya Pradesh Premier League | Madhya Pradesh Women's Premier League |
| 19 | Maharashtra | Maharashtra State Senior Men's Football League | Maharashtra State Senior Women's Football League |
| 20 | Manipur | Manipur State League | Manipur Women's League |
| 21 | Meghalaya | Meghalaya State League | SSA Women's Football League |
| 22 | Mizoram | Mizoram Premier League | Mizoram Women's League |
| 23 | Nagaland | Nagaland Premier League | Nagaland Women's Football League |
| 24 | Odisha | FAO League | Odisha Women's League |
| 25 | Puducherry | Pondicherry Men's League Championship | Pondicherry Women's League |
| 26 | Punjab | Punjab State Super League | Punjab Women's League |
| 27 | Sikkim | Sikkim Football League | Sikkim Women's Super League |
| 28 | Rajasthan | Rajasthan State Men's League | - |
| 29 | Tamil Nadu | Chennai Football League | Tamil Nadu Women's League |
| 30 | Telangana | Rahim League A Division | - |
| 31 | Tripura | Chandra Memorial League | - |
| 32 | Uttarakhand | Uttarakhand Super League | - |
| 33 | Uttar Pradesh | Lucknow Super Division | - |
| 34 | West Bengal | Calcutta Football League | Kanyashree Cup |

== Football in modern India ==
=== International football ===
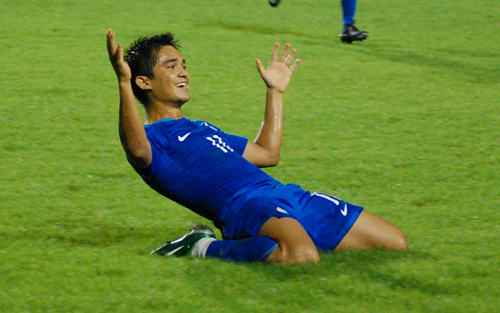
Chhetri is the highest goal scorer in india and ranked 5th in men's international Football

International football in India generally takes place between September and November for Men's according to FIFA Men's International Match Calendar (2023-2030) and between February–July and October–December for Women's according to FIFA Women's International Match Calendar (2023-2025). Football in India is managed by the All India Football Federation (AIFF).The Indian national football team has also provided some of the greatest players to the world, the biggest example of which is Sunil Chhetri. Indian football has a rich history. The Indian men's national team is currently ranked 124 (as of 18 July 2024) in FIFA Men's World Ranking and Women's national team is currently ranked 67 (as of 14 June 2024) in FIFA Women's World Ranking.

=== Domestic football ===
==== Men's domestic football ====
===== State competitions =====
- Senior Men's National Football Championship, National Football Championship for Santosh Trophy, or simply Santosh Trophy, is an inter-state competition contested by the state associations and government institutions. Many players who have represented India played in the Santosh Trophy.
- National Games
- Swami Vivekananda NFC (U20)
- Khelo India Youth Games (U-21/U-17)
- Junior Boy's National Football Championship also known as BC Roy Trophy, is held for players under 15 years of age. It is held in memory of former West Bengal Chief Minister Bidhan Chandra Roy.
- Sub-Junior Boy's National Football championship was started in 1977 for boys under the age of 16. AIFF donated the trophy in the memory of former president of Karnataka State Football Association, Mir Iqbal Hussain.
- National Beach Soccer Championship is an annual beach soccer tournament.

===== Club competitions =====
As of 2023, India has four national-level leagues. The Indian Super League is the top league, followed by I-League, I-League 2 and I-League 3. I-League 3 currently acts as a final round for the top teams in the state leagues that are nominated by state football associations. India has several cup tournaments, including the Durand Cup, Super Cup and IFA Shield.

====== Leagues ======
- Tier 1: Indian Super League- The I-League, which was promised to be a professional league, soon lost popularity due to poor marketing. A deal between Zee Sports and the AIFF, which was initially to be a ten-year term in 2006, was terminated in 2010 after a disagreement between the parties. The AIFF then signed a ₹700-crore deal with Reliance Industries and the International Management Group (IMG) on 9 December 2010. The Indian Super League (ISL) was officially launched on 21 October 2013 by IMG–Reliance Industries, Star Sports, and the AIFF to grow the sport of football in India and increase its exposure in the country with big names and professionalism. Large corporations, Bollywood stars and cricketers between them bought eight franchises. In 2017, the AFC opposed allowing the ISL to become the main league in India, but the I-League clubs East Bengal and Mohun Bagan wanted a complete merger of the ISL and I-League. Two weeks later, the AIFF proposed the Indian Super League and I-League would simultaneously run on a short–term basis, with the I-League winner qualifying for the AFC Champions League and the ISL champion reaching the AFC Cup qualification stage. The AFC approved this proposal on 25 July 2017, with the ISL replacing the domestic cup competition, the Federation Cup, which was a true knockout cup competition.
- Tier 2: I-League- Starting in the 2022–2023 season, I-League lost its top-tier status. The champions of the 2022–23 I-League, Punjab FC, were promoted to the ISL with no participation fee. As per the AFC's recommendation for 2024–2025, it was agreed the AIFF would fully implement promotion and relegation between the two leagues. As of 2024, there have been two promotions from the I-League to the ISL but the relegation system is yet to be implemented.
- Tier 3: I-League 2- After demoting I-League to the second tier status in Indian football, I-League 2 was subsequently demoted to the third tier. AIFF renamed the 2nd Division to I-League 2 to avoid disambiguation. I-League and I-League 2 follow both promotion and relegation within the two leagues.
- Tier 4: I-League 3- I-League 3 is set to serve as a platform for state champions and state-nominated teams. No ISL reserve teams can be a part of I-League 2 or I-League 3.
- Tier 5–10: Indian State Leagues- There are currently a total of 36 state associations (including union territories) affiliated with the AIFF. These state associations are affiliated with state leagues. The top teams of state leagues are eligible to apply for I-League 3. Some state leagues have multiple divisions and a promotion/relegation system between these divisions. Calcutta Football League in West Bengal is the oldest state league and has the highest number of divisions (six divisions) with a promotion/relegation system in place.
- Youth League (U-17/U-15/U-13)- The Youth League is a system of youth football leagues that are managed, organised and controlled by the All India Football Federation. It consists of 3 age groups competitions: U17 (AIFF Youth League), U15 (Junior League) and U13 (Sub-Junior League).
- Futsal Club Championship-The Futsal Club Championship is the highest level futsal club competition in India, organised by the All India Football Federation (AIFF). The inaugural edition kicked off on 5 November 2021 in New Delhi with 16 teams. It acts as qualifier for the AFC Futsal Club Championship, the highest level club futsal competition in Asia.

====== Cups ======
List of All India football tournaments
| Competition | Organizer | Host city/state |
|---|---|---|
| Durand Cup | DFTS (Durand Football Tournament Society) and AIFF | Various |
| Super Cup | AIFF | Various |

===== Champions overview =====
The competitions currently active in Indian football in the 2024–25 season.

State competition
| Tournament | Current champions |
|---|---|
| Santosh Trophy | West Bengal |
| National Games (Men) | Kerala |
| Swami Vivekananda NFC (U20) | Delhi |
| Junior NFC (U19) | West Bengal |
| Sub-Junior NFC (U16) | Mizoram |
| National Beach Soccer Championship | Kerala |

Club competition
| Tournament | Current champions |
|---|---|
| Indian Super League | Shield: Mohun Bagan SG; Cup: Mohun Bagan SG |
| I-League | Churchill Brothers |
| I-League 2 | Diamond Harbour |
| I-League 3 | Diamond Harbour |
| Super Cup | Goa |
| Durand Cup | North East United |
| Youth League (U-17) | Punjab (R) |
| Youth League (U-15) | Punjab (R) |
| Youth League (U-13) | Minerva Academy |
| Futsal Club Championship | Corbett |

==== Women's domestic football ====
===== State competitions =====
- Senior Women's National Football Championship for Rajmata Jijabai Trophy, also known as Senior Women's National Football Championship or Rajmata Jijabai Trophy since 2024, is a women's football tournament contested by state associations and government institutions in India. The first edition was held in 1991 by the AIFF to crown the national women's football champion.
- National Games Football for women was introduced in the 1999 edition. Manipur is the most successful team with 5 gold medals.
- Khelo India Youth Games (U-21/U-17) are held every year, and a 1,000 kids are given the scholarship of ₹5 lakh (US$5,300) to prepare them for the international sporting events.
- Junior Girl's National Football Championship is held for under-19 players, between the teams representing state associations. The tournament was instituted by the AIFF in 2001.
- Sub–Junior Girl's National Football Championship is held for under-17 players. The tournament was instituted by the AIFF in 2003.

===== Club competitions =====
- Tier 1: Indian Women's League: Indian Women's League is the women's top tier professional football league in India.
- Tier 2: Indian Women's League 2: Indian Women's League 2 is the women's second tier professional football league in India. The competition is established in 2023, with the first season starting from 2024.
- Tier 3–5: Indian State Leagues: There are currently a total of 36 state associations (including union territories) affiliated with the AIFF. The top teams of state leagues are eligible to apply for Indian Women's League 2. Karnataka Women's League has the highest number of divisions (3), with a promotion/relegation system in place.

===== Champions overview =====
The competitions currently active in Indian football in the 2024–25 season.

State competition
| Tournament | Current champions |
|---|---|
| Rajmata Jijabai Senior Women's NFC | Manipur |
| National Games (Women) | Haryana |
| Junior Girl's NFC (U19) | Manipur |
| Sub-Junior Girl's NFC (U17) | Manipur |

Club competition
| Tournament | Current champions |
|---|---|
| Indian Women's League | East Bengal |
| Indian Women's League 2 | Garhwal United |

==== Evolution of the football system ====
Men's
| Level | | Years | | | | | | | | | | | | | | | | |
| Level | | 1888–1893 | | 1898–1941 | | 1941–1977 | 1977–1996 | 1996–1997 | 1997–2001 | 2001–2006 | 2006–2007 | 2007–2011 | 2011–2014 | 2014–2017 | 2017–2022 | 2022–2023 | 2023–2026 | 2026–present |
|---|---|---|---|---|---|---|---|---|---|---|---|---|---|---|---|---|---|---|
| Level | | | 1893 | | 1937 | 1941–1977 | 1977–1996 | 1996–1997 | 1997–2001 | 2001–2006 | 2006–2007 | 2007–2011 | 2011–2014 | 2014–2017 | 2017–2022 | 2022–2023 | 2023–2026 | 2026–present |
| National leagues | 1 | None | Formation of Indian Football Association (IFA) | State Leagues | | Santosh Trophy | | National Football League | | | | I-League | | | Indian Super League | Indian Super League | | |
| National leagues | 1 | None | Formation of Indian Football Association (IFA) | State Leagues | | Santosh Trophy | | National Football League | | | | I-League | | | I-League | Indian Super League | | |
| National leagues | 2 | None | Formation of Indian Football Association (IFA) | None | Formation of All India Football Federation (AIFF) | None | | | NFL Second Division | | | I-League 2nd Division | | | | I-League | | Indian Football League |
| National leagues | 3 | None | Formation of Indian Football Association (IFA) | None | Formation of All India Football Federation (AIFF) | None | | | | | NFL Third Division | Discontinued | | | | I-League 2 | | |
| National leagues | 4 | None | Formation of Indian Football Association (IFA) | None | Formation of All India Football Federation (AIFF) | None | | | | | | | | | | | I-League 3 | |
| Regional leagues | 5–11 | None | Formation of Indian Football Association (IFA) | None | Formation of All India Football Federation (AIFF) | State Leagues | | | | | | | | | | | | |
| Cup competitions | | Durand Cup | | | | | | | | | | | | | | | | |
| Cup competitions | | | | | | | Federation Cup | | | | | | | | AIFF Super Cup | | | |
| Cup competitions | | | | | | | | Indian Super Cup | | | | | Discontinued | | | | | |

Women's
| Level | | Years | | | |
| Level | | 1937 | 1991–2016 | 2016–2023 | 2023-present |
|---|---|---|---|---|---|
| National leagues | 1 | Formation of All India Football Federation (AIFF) | Senior Women's National Football Championship | Indian Women's League | |
| National leagues | 2 | Formation of All India Football Federation (AIFF) | None | | Indian Women's League 2 |
| Regional leagues | 3– | Formation of All India Football Federation (AIFF) | State Leagues | | |

=== Qualification for Asian competitions ===
| Competition | Qualifying team | Notes |
|---|---|---|
| AFC Champions League Two | Premiers of Indian Super League | Qualification to the Group stage |
| AFC Champions League Two | Winners of Super Cup | Qualification to the Qualifying play-off |
| AFC Women's Champions League | Champions of Indian Women's League | Qualification to the Preliminary stage |

== Stadiums ==
As of 2023, few of India's national football stadiums meet current world standards. The largest football stadiums in India are the Salt Lake Stadium in Kolkata with a seating capacity of 68,000 and the Jawaharlal Nehru Stadium in New Delhi with a capacity of over 60,000. The Barabati Stadium in Cuttack and Kalinga Stadium in Bhubaneswar are major arenas for football events in Odisha. In Sikkim, the 30,000-capacity Paljor Stadium in Gangtok is famous as one of the most beautiful stadiums in the world because of its backdrop of the Himalayas. The main stadium in Shillong is the Jawaharlal Nehru Stadium with a capacity of 30,000 standing. Both the Paljor and the JLN in Shillong have been renovated with artificial playing surfaces. Some other important stadiums are the Shree Shiv Chhatrapati Sports Complex in Pune, Barasat Stadium in Barasat, the Fatorda Stadium in Goa, the Kaloor International Stadium in Kochi, the Municipal Corporation Stadium in Kozhikode, the Jawaharlal Nehru Stadium in Guwahati and the EKA Arena in Ahmedabad. There are hundreds of other stadiums in the country. The following stadiums are affiliated by All India Football Federation.

| Tenants | Name | City | State | Capacity | Image |
|---|---|---|---|---|---|
| East Bengal, Mohun Bagan | Salt Lake Stadium † | Bidhannagar | West Bengal | 68,000 | |
| Punjab, Delhi | Jawaharlal Nehru Stadium † | Delhi | Delhi | 60,254 | |
| | Greenfield International Stadium † | Thiruvananthapuram | Kerala | 50,000 | |
| Gokulam Kerala | EMS Stadium † | Kozhikode | Kerala | 50,000 | |
| | DY Patil Stadium † | Navi Mumbai | Maharastra | 45,300 | |
| | Birsa Munda Football Stadium | Ranchi | Jharkhand | 40,000 | |
| Kerala Blasters | Kaloor Stadium † | Kochi | Kerala | 40,000 | |
| Chennaiyin | Marina Arena † | Chennai | Tamil Nadu | 40,000 | |
| NorthEast United | Indira Gandhi Athletic Stadium † | Guwahati | Assam | 25,000 | |
| | Lal Bahadur Shastri Stadium | Kollam | Kerala | 40,000 | |
| Shillong Lajong | Jawaharlal Nehru Stadium † | Shillong | Meghalaya | 21,000 | |
| | Kanchenjunga Stadium † | Siliguri | West Bengal | 40,000 | |

Note. † denotes stadiums that have hosted international football matches.

== International competitions hosted ==
| Competition | Edition | Winner | Final | Runners-up | India's position | Venues | Final venue | Stadium |
Men's senior competitions
| Asian Games | 1951 Asian Games | India | 1–0 | Iran | Champions | 1 (in 1 city) | Major Dhyan Chand National Stadium | |
| Asian Games | 1982 Asian Games | Iraq | 1–0 | Kuwait | Quarterfinals | 3 (in 1 cities) | Jawaharlal Nehru Stadium (Delhi) | |
| AFC Challenge Cup | 2008 AFC Challenge Cup | India | 4–1 | Tajikistan | Champions | 3 (in 2 cities) | Ambedkar Stadium | |
| SAFF Championship | 1999 SAFF Gold Cup | India | 2–0 | Bangladesh | Champions | 1 ( in 1 city) | Fatorda Stadium | |
| SAFF Championship | 2011 SAFF Championship | India | 4–0 | Afghanistan | Champions | 1 (in 1 city) | Jawaharlal Nehru Stadium (Delhi) | |
| SAFF Championship | 2015 SAFF Championship | India | 2–1 (a.e.t) | Afghanistan | Champions | 1 (in 1 city) | Greenfield International Stadium | |
| SAFF Championship | 2023 SAFF Championship | India | 1–1 (a.e.t) (5–4 pen.) | Kuwait | Champions | 1 (in 1 city) | Sree Kanteerava Stadium | |
Men's youth competitions
| FIFA U-17 World Cup | 2017 FIFA U-17 World Cup | England | 5–2 | Spain | Group stage | 6 (in 6 cities) | Salt Lake Stadium | |
| AFC U-20 Asian Cup | 2006 AFC Youth Championship | North Korea | 1–1 (5–3 pen.) | Japan | Group stage | 4 (in 2 cities) | Salt Lake Stadium | |
| AFC U-17 Asian Cup | 2016 AFC U-16 Championship | Iraq | 0–0 (4–3 pen.) | Iran | Group stage | 2 (in 2 cities) | Fatorda Stadium | |
| SAFF U-17 Championship | 2019 SAFF U-15 Championship | India | 7–0 | Nepal | Champions | 1 (in 1 city) | Kalyani Stadium | |
| SAFF U-20 Championship | 2022 SAFF U-20 Championship | India | 5–2 (a.e.t) | Bangladesh | Champions | 1 (in 1 city) | Kalinga Stadium | |
Women's senior competitions
| AFC Women's Asian Cup | 2022 AFC Women's Asian Cup | China | 3–2 | South Korea | Withdrew (due to Covid-19 breakout) | 3 (in 3 cities) | DY Patil Stadium | |
| SAFF Women's Championship | 2016 SAFF Women's Championship | India | 3–1 | Bangladesh | Champions | 1 (in 1 city) | Kanchenjunga Stadium | |
| SAFF Women's Championship | 2026 SAFF Women's Championship | India | 3–1 | Bangladesh | Champions | 1 (in 1 city) | Fatorda Stadium | |
Women's youth competitions
| FIFA U-17 Women's World Cup | 2022 FIFA U-17 Women's World Cup | Spain | 1–0 | Colombia | Group stage | 3 (in 3 cities) | DY Patil Stadium | |

=== Nehru Cup ===
The Nehru Cup was an international invitational association football tournament organised by the AIFF and named after the First Prime Minister of India Jawaharlal Nehru.

| Editions | Winners |
|---|---|
| 1982 | Uruguay |
| 1983 | Hungary |
| 1984 | Poland |
| 1985 | Soviet Union |
| 1986 | Soviet Union |
| 1987 | Soviet Union |
| 1988 | Soviet Union |
| 1989 | Hungary |
| 1991 | Romania |
| 1993 | North Korea |
| 1995 | Iraq |
| 1997 | Iraq |
| 2007 | India |
| 2009 | India |
| 2012 | India |

=== Tri-Nation Series ===
The Tri-Nation Series is a three-team football tournament organised by the AIFF. The first edition was held in 2017.

| Editions | Winners |
|---|---|
| 2017 | India |
| 2023 | India |

=== Intercontinental Cup ===
The Intercontinental Cup is a four-team association football tournament organised by the AIFF. The first edition was held in 2018.

| Editions | Winners |
|---|---|
| 2018 | India |
| 2019 | North Korea |
| 2023 | India |
| 2024 | Syria |

=== Gold Cup (India) ===
The Gold Cup is a 4-team women's [association football tournament organised by the AIFF. It was launched in 2019 with the first edition being held at the Kalinga Stadium in association with the Government of Odisha. The tournament naming rights were purchased by Hero MotoCorp which also sponsors the national team.

| Editions | Winners |
|---|---|
| 2019 | Myanmar |

== Performance in international competitions ==
=== Men's team ===
A red box around the year indicates tournaments played within India

==== FIFA World Cup ====
India has never played in the finals of the FIFA World Cup. After gaining independence in 1947, India managed to qualify for the World Cup held in 1950. This was due to Myanmar, Indonesia, and the Philippines withdrawing from qualification round. However, prior to the start of the tournament, India withdrew due to the expenses required in getting the team to Brazil. But this reason was untrue because FIFA was ready to give money to India (AIFF) for their trip to Brazil. Other reasons cited for why India withdrew include FIFA not allowing Indian players to play in the tournament barefoot and the All India Football Federation not considering the FIFA World Cup an important tournament compared to the Olympics.

After withdrawing from the 1950 FIFA World Cup, India did not enter the qualifying rounds of the tournament between 1954 and 1982. Since the 1986 qualifiers, with the exception of the 1990 edition of the tournament, the team participated in World Cup qualification, but has yet to qualify for the finals again.

| FIFA World Cup record | | | | | | | | | | Qualification record | | | | | | |
| Year | Round | Pld | W | D | L | GF | GA | Squad | Pos | Pld | W | D | L | GF | GA | Ref. |
|---|---|---|---|---|---|---|---|---|---|---|---|---|---|---|---|---|
| (Uruguay) 1930 to (France) 1938 | Not a FIFA member | | | | | | | | | Not a FIFA member | | | | | | – |
| (Brazil) 1950 | Qualified, withdrew | | | | | | | | | Qualified by default | | | | | | |
| (Switzerland) 1954 | Denied by FIFA | | | | | | | | | Denied by FIFA | | | | | | |
| (Sweden) 1958 to (Spain) 1982 | Did not enter | | | | | | | | | Did not enter | | | | | | – |
| (Mexico) 1986 | Did not qualify | | | | | | | | | 6 | 2 | 3 | 1 | 7 | 6 | |
| (Italy) 1990 | Did not qualify | | | | | | | | | Withdrew from qualification | | | | | | |
| (United States) 1994 | Did not qualify | | | | | | | | | 8 | 1 | 1 | 6 | 8 | 22 | |
| (France) 1998 | Did not qualify | | | | | | | | | 3 | 1 | 1 | 1 | 3 | 7 | |
| (South Korea) (Japan) 2002 | Did not qualify | | | | | | | | | 6 | 3 | 2 | 1 | 11 | 5 | |
| (Germany) 2006 | Did not qualify | | | | | | | | | 6 | 1 | 1 | 4 | 2 | 18 | |
| (South Africa) 2010 | Did not qualify | | | | | | | | | 2 | 0 | 1 | 1 | 3 | 6 | |
| (Brazil) 2014 | Did not qualify | | | | | | | | | 2 | 0 | 1 | 1 | 2 | 5 | |
| (Russia) 2018 | Did not qualify | | | | | | | | | 8 | 2 | 1 | 7 | 7 | 18 | |
| (Qatar) 2022 | Did not qualify | | | | | | | | | 8 | 1 | 4 | 3 | 6 | 7 | |
| (Canada) (Mexico) (United States) 2026 | Did not qualify | | | | | | | | | 6 | 1 | 2 | 3 | 3 | 7 | – |
| (Morocco) (Portugal) (Spain) 2030 | To be determined | | | | | | | | | To be determined | | | | | | |
| (Saudi Arabia) 2034 | To be determined | | | | | | | | | To be determined | | | | | | |
| Total | — | 0/20 | 0 | 0 | 0 | 0 | 0 | 0 | — | 57 | 12 | 17 | 28 | 52 | 101 | — |

==== AFC Asian Cup ====
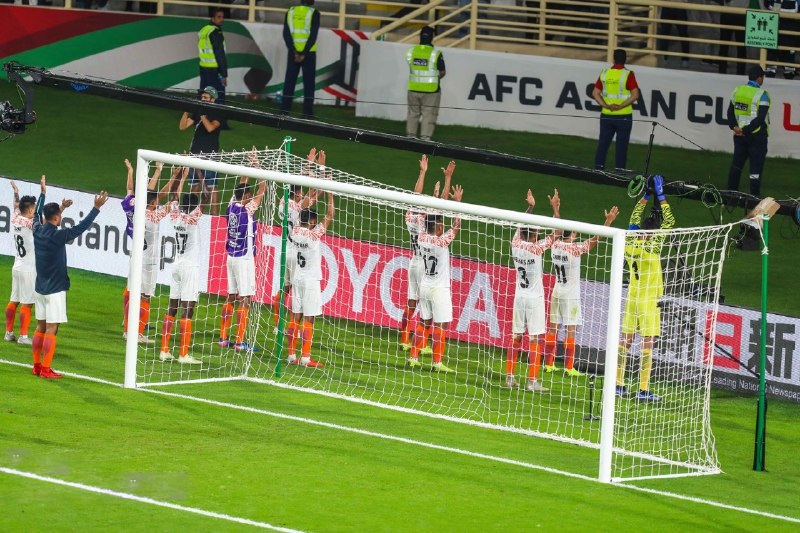
Indian players celebrating with fans after winning a match at 2019 AFC Asian Cup

India has qualified for the AFC Asian Cup five times. The team played their first Asian Cup in 1964. The team managed to qualify following other nations' refusal to play against India due to political reasons. India managed to finish the tournament as runners-up to hosts Israel, with Inder Singh finishing as joint top-scorer. Since then, India has failed to progress beyond the first round of the Asian Cup, with their participation at the 1984 and 2011 Asian Cups, and most recently the 2019 Asian Cup.

In June 2022, India qualified for the 2023 AFC Asian Cup after winning all the matches in the third round of 2023 AFC Asian Cup qualification. This is the first time ever India qualified consecutively for the continental championship.

| AFC Asian Cup record | | | | | | | | | | Qualification record | | | | | | |
| Year | Result | Position | Pld | W | D | L | GF | GA | Squad | Pld | W | D | L | GF | GA | Ref. |
|---|---|---|---|---|---|---|---|---|---|---|---|---|---|---|---|---|
| (Hong Kong) 1956 | Did not enter | | | | | | | | | Did not enter | | | | | | – |
| (South Korea) 1960 | Did not qualify | | | | | | | | | 6 | 2 | 0 | 4 | 7 | 9 | |
| (Israel) 1964 | Runners-up | 2nd | 3 | 2 | 0 | 1 | 5 | 3 | Squad | Qualified by default | | | | | | |
| (Iran) 1968 | Did not qualify | | | | | | | | | 3 | 0 | 1 | 2 | 2 | 6 | |
| (Thailand) 1972 | Did not enter | | | | | | | | | Did not enter | | | | | | |
| (Iran) 1976 | Did not enter | | | | | | | | | Did not enter | | | | | | |
| (Kuwait) 1980 | Did not enter | | | | | | | | | Did not enter | | | | | | |
| (Singapore) 1984 | Group stage | 10th | 4 | 0 | 1 | 3 | 0 | 7 | Squad | 4 | 3 | 0 | 1 | 8 | 2 | |
| (Qatar) 1988 | Did not qualify | | | | | | | | | 5 | 0 | 1 | 4 | 0 | 6 | |
| (Japan) 1992 | Did not qualify | | | | | | | | | 2 | 1 | 0 | 1 | 2 | 3 | |
| (United Arab Emirates) 1996 | Did not qualify | | | | | | | | | 2 | 0 | 0 | 2 | 3 | 12 | |
| (Lebanon) 2000 | Did not qualify | | | | | | | | | 4 | 1 | 1 | 2 | 8 | 9 | |
| (China) 2004 | Did not qualify | | | | | | | | | 2 | 0 | 1 | 1 | 1 | 3 | |
| (Indonesia) (Malaysia) (Thailand) (Vietnam) 2007 | Did not qualify | | | | | | | | | 6 | 0 | 0 | 6 | 2 | 24 | |
| (Qatar) 2011 | Group stage | 16th | 3 | 0 | 0 | 3 | 3 | 13 | Squad | AFC Challenge Cup | | | | | | |
| (Australia) 2015 | Did not qualify | | | | | | | | | AFC Challenge Cup | | | | | | |
| (United Arab Emirates) 2019 | Group stage | 17th | 3 | 1 | 0 | 2 | 4 | 4 | Squad | 18 | 8 | 2 | 8 | 25 | 24 | |
| (Qatar) 2023 | Group stage | 24th | 3 | 0 | 0 | 3 | 0 | 6 | Squad | 11 | 4 | 4 | 3 | 14 | 8 | |
| (Saudi Arabia) 2027 | To be determined | | | | | | | | | 6 | 1 | 2 | 3 | 3 | 7 | – |
| Total | Runners-up | 2nd | 16 | 3 | 1 | 12 | 12 | 33 | — | 69 | 20 | 13 | 36 | 76 | 113 | — |

==== Summer Olympics ====
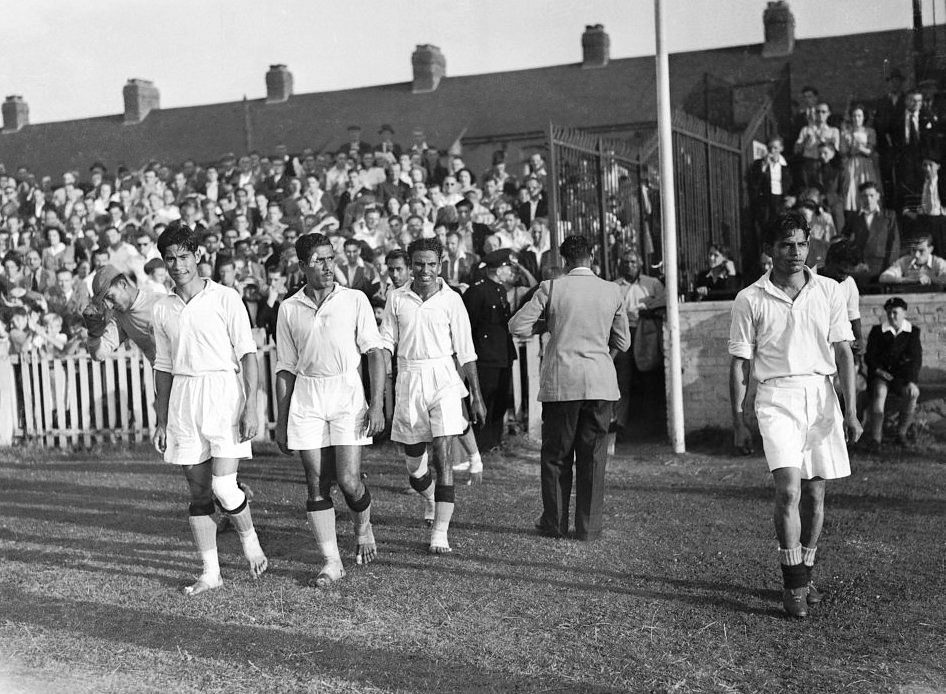
Talimeren Ao on the left, leading the Indian team to Cricklefield Stadium to play against France in 1948

India competed in four straight Olympic football tournaments between 1948 and 1960. Their sole 1948 Olympics match against France was also India's first ever international match since the country gained independence in 1947. During the match, a majority of the Indian side played barefoot. The match ended in a 2–1 defeat, with Sarangapani Raman scoring the lone goal for India. India then returned to the Olympics four years later where they took on Yugoslavia in the preliminary rounds. The team suffered a 10–1 defeat, India's largest margin of defeat in a competitive match, and were knocked out.

Four years later, during the 1956 Olympics, India managed to reach the semi-finals and finish fourth. After India's first round opponents, Hungary, withdrew from the tournament, the team played against hosts Australia in the quarter-finals. A Neville D'Souza hat-trick, the first by an Asian footballer in the Olympics, helped India win 4–2. However, in the semi-finals, India once again suffered defeat against Yugoslavia, going down 4–1. In the bronze medal match, India were defeated 3–0 by Bulgaria.

In 1960, India competed in Group D with Hungary, France and Peru. India ended the group in last place, drawing once. India have since failed to qualify for another Olympic games.

| Summer Olympics record | | | | | | | | | | Qualification record | | | | | | |
| Year | Result | Position | Pld | W | D | L | GF | GA | Squad | Pld | W | D | L | GF | GA | Ref. |
|---|---|---|---|---|---|---|---|---|---|---|---|---|---|---|---|---|
| (United Kingdom) 1908 to (Germany) 1936 | Did not enter | | | | | | | | | Did not enter | | | | | | – |
| (United Kingdom) 1948 | Round 1 | 11th | 1 | 0 | 0 | 1 | 1 | 2 | Squad | Qualified automatically | | | | | | |
| (Finland) 1952 | Preliminaries | 25th | 1 | 0 | 0 | 1 | 1 | 10 | Squad | Qualified automatically | | | | | | |
| (Australia) 1956 | Semi-finals | 4th | 3 | 1 | 0 | 2 | 5 | 9 | Squad | Bye | | | | | | |
| (Italy) 1960 | Round 1 | 13th | 3 | 0 | 1 | 2 | 3 | 6 | Squad | 3 | 3 | 0 | 0 | 11 | 4 | |
| (Japan) 1964 to (South Korea) 1988 | Did not qualify | | | | | | | | | 20 | 6 | 1 | 13 | 34 | 38 | – |
| (Spain) 1992–present | See India national U-23 team | | | | | | | | | See India national U-23 team | | | | | | |
| Totals | Semi-finals | 4th | 8 | 1 | 1 | 6 | 10 | 27 | — | 23 | 9 | 1 | 13 | 45 | 42 | — |

==== Asian Games ====
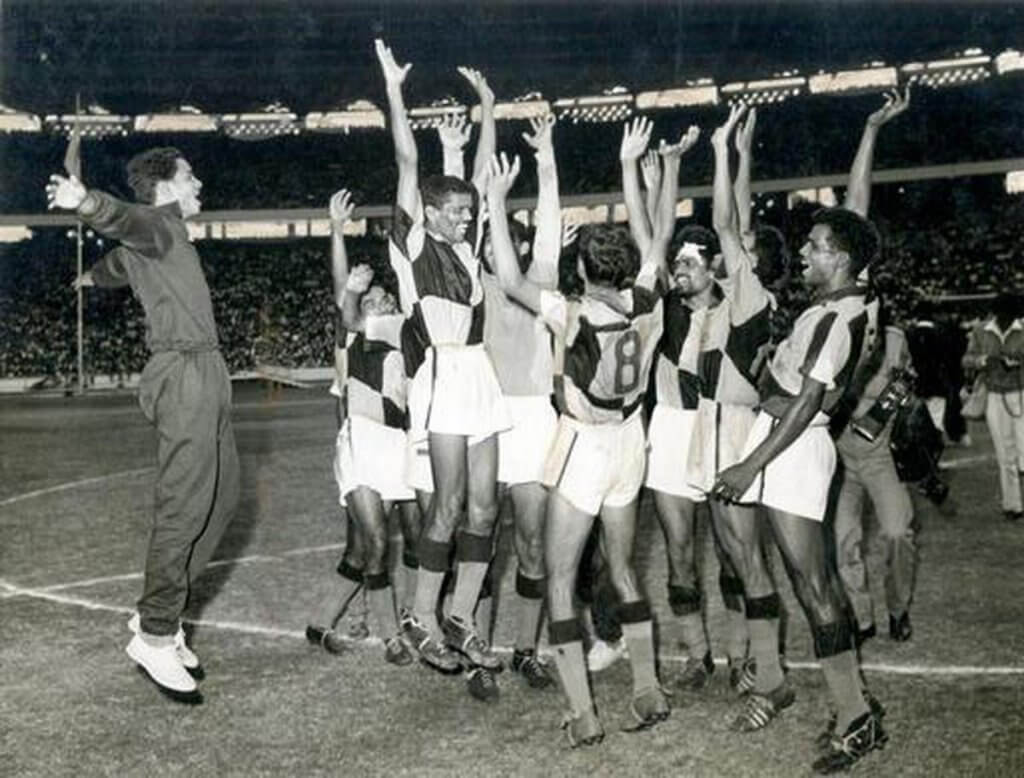
Indian team celebrating after defeating South Korea in the final of 1962 Asiad at Senayan Main Stadium, Jakarta

India competed in eleven Asian Games, starting from 1951 to 1998, except the 1990 and 1994 editions. In 1951 Asian Games India won their first match against Indonesia in the first round and then defeated Japan in semi-final and went on to win against Iran in the final in front of the home crowd. The achievement of the Indian team was a special one as they became the first ever Asian Games gold medalists in football.

Though the next two tournaments proved to be less successful for the team, they bounced back by winning gold at the 1962 Asian games by defeating the Asian Cup winners South Korea. The team failed to defend their title in 1966 and went on to claim the bronze medal in 1970.

This was the last time India ever finished on the medal podium, the next years proved to be hard to regain their dominance as the side went through a sharp decline. The team made their return in 1998.

Asian Games record
| Year | Result | Position | Pld | W | D | L | GF | GA | Squad | Ref. |
|---|---|---|---|---|---|---|---|---|---|---|
| (India) 1951 | Champions | 1st | 3 | 3 | 0 | 0 | 7 | 0 | Squad | |
| (Philippines) 1954 | Round 1 | 8th | 2 | 1 | 0 | 1 | 3 | 6 | Squad | |
| (Japan) 1958 | Semi-finals | 4th | 5 | 2 | 0 | 3 | 12 | 13 | Squad | |
| (Indonesia) 1962 | Champions | 1st | 5 | 4 | 0 | 1 | 11 | 6 | Squad | |
| (Thailand) 1966 | Round 1 | 8th | 3 | 1 | 0 | 2 | 4 | 7 | Squad | |
| (Thailand) 1970 | Third place | 3rd | 6 | 3 | 1 | 2 | 8 | 5 | Squad | |
| (Iran) 1974 | Round 1 | 13th | 3 | 0 | 0 | 3 | 2 | 14 | Squad | |
| (Thailand) 1978 | Round 2 | 8th | 5 | 1 | 0 | 4 | 5 | 13 | Squad | |
| (India) 1982 | Quarter-finals | 6th | 4 | 2 | 1 | 1 | 5 | 3 | Squad | |
| (South Korea) 1986 | Round 1 | 16th | 3 | 0 | 0 | 3 | 1 | 8 | Squad | |
| (China) 1990 | Did not enter | | | | | | | | | |
| (Japan) 1994 | Did not enter | | | | | | | | | |
| (Thailand) 1998 | Round 2 | 16th | 5 | 1 | 0 | 4 | 3 | 8 | Squad | |
| (South Korea) 2002–present | See India national U-23 team | | | | | | | | | |
| Totals | 2 titles | 1st | 44 | 18 | 2 | 24 | 61 | 83 | — | – |

==== SAFF Championship ====
India has been the most successful team in the competition, winning overall eight titles. The team played in the knockout stage of every tournament except in 1993, when the tournament was in a league format. The team also boasts a prestigious record of claiming medal at every championship played so far. India has played in the final of every championship except the 2003, tournament where they claimed bronze medal.

SAFF Championship record
| Year | Result | Position | Pld | W | D | L | GF | GA | Squad | Ref. |
|---|---|---|---|---|---|---|---|---|---|---|
| (Pakistan) 1993 | Champions | 1st | 3 | 2 | 1 | 0 | 4 | 1 | —N/a | |
| (Sri Lanka) 1995 | Runners-up | 2nd | 3 | 0 | 2 | 1 | 2 | 3 | Squad | |
| (Nepal) 1997 | Champions | 1st | 4 | 3 | 1 | 0 | 12 | 3 | —N/a | |
| (India) 1999 | Champions | 1st | 4 | 3 | 1 | 0 | 6 | 1 | Squad | |
| (Bangladesh) 2003 | Third place | 3rd | 5 | 2 | 1 | 2 | 8 | 5 | Squad | |
| (Pakistan) 2005 | Champions | 1st | 5 | 4 | 1 | 0 | 9 | 2 | Squad | |
| (Maldives) (Sri Lanka) 2008 | Runners-up | 2nd | 5 | 4 | 0 | 1 | 9 | 3 | Squad | |
| (India) 2011 | Champions | 1st | 5 | 4 | 1 | 0 | 16 | 2 | Squad | |
| (Nepal) 2013 | Runners-up | 2nd | 5 | 2 | 1 | 2 | 4 | 5 | Squad | |
| (India) 2015 | Champions | 1st | 4 | 4 | 0 | 0 | 11 | 4 | Squad | |
| (Bangladesh) 2018 | Runners-up | 2nd | 4 | 3 | 0 | 1 | 8 | 3 | Squad | |
| (Maldives) 2021 | Champions | 1st | 5 | 3 | 2 | 0 | 8 | 2 | Squad | |
| (India) 2023 | Champions | 1st | 5 | 2 | 3 | 0 | 8 | 2 | Squad | |
| Total | 8 titles | 1st | 57 | 36 | 14 | 7 | 105 | 36 | — | – |

==== South Asian Games ====
India has participated in every edition of senior football at the South Asian Games, except in 1984. The team emerged as champions in 1985, 1987, and 1995. They also took home silver in 1993, and bronze medals in 1989 and 1995.

South Asian Games record
| Year | Result | Position | Pld | W | D | L | GF | GA | Squad | Ref. |
|---|---|---|---|---|---|---|---|---|---|---|
| (Nepal) 1984 | Did not enter | | | | | | | | | |
| (Bangladesh) 1985 | Champions | 1st | 3 | 2 | 1 | 0 | 6 | 1 | —N/a | |
| (India) 1987 | Champions | 1st | 3 | 2 | 1 | 0 | 6 | 0 | —N/a | |
| (Pakistan) 1989 | Third place | 3rd | 3 | 2 | 1 | 0 | 5 | 3 | —N/a | |
| (Sri Lanka) 1991 | Group stage | 6th | 2 | 0 | 1 | 1 | 1 | 2 | —N/a | |
| (Bangladesh) 1993 | Runners-up | 2nd | 3 | 1 | 2 | 0 | 6 | 4 | —N/a | |
| (India) 1995 | Champions | 1st | 3 | 3 | 0 | 0 | 5 | 0 | —N/a | |
| (Nepal) 1999 | Third place | 3rd | 5 | 4 | 0 | 1 | 15 | 4 | —N/a | |
| (Pakistan) 2004–present | See India national U-20 team & India national U-23 team | | | | | | | | | |
| Totals | 3 titles | 1st | 22 | 14 | 6 | 2 | 44 | 14 | — | — |

==== Other/defunct tournaments ====
| Nehru Cup | AFC Challenge Cup | Tri-Nation Series | Intercontinental Cup |
|---|---|---|---|
| (Uruguay) 1982: 5th place; (Hungary) 1983: (Poland) 1984: 6th place; (Soviet Union) 1985: (Soviet Union) 1986: (Soviet Union) 1987: (Soviet Union) 1988: (Hungary) 1989: (Romania) 1991: (North Korea) 1993: (Iraq) 1995: 4th place; (Iraq) 1997: 3rd place; (India) 2007: Champions; (India) 2009: Champions; (India) 2012: Champions | (Bangladesh) 2016: Quarter-finals; (India) 2008: Champions; (Sri Lanka) 2010: Group Stage; (Nepal) 2012: Group Stage | (India) 2017: Champions; (India) 2023: Champions | (India) 2018: Champions; (India) 2019: 4th place; (India) 2023: Champions; (India) 2024: 3rd place |

=== Women's team ===
==== FIFA Women's World Cup ====
FIFA Women's World Cup record
| Year | Result | Position | Pld | W | D* | L | GF | GA | GD |
|---|---|---|---|---|---|---|---|---|---|
| (China) 1991 | Did not enter | | | | | | | | |
| (Sweden) 1995 | Did not enter | | | | | | | | |
| (United States) 1999 | Did not qualify | | | | | | | | |
| (United States) 2003 | Did not qualify | | | | | | | | |
| (China) 2007 | Did not qualify | | | | | | | | |
| (Germany) 2011 | Did not enter | | | | | | | | |
| (Canada) 2015 | Did not qualify | | | | | | | | |
| (France) 2019 | Did not qualify | | | | | | | | |
| (Australia) (New Zealand) 2023 | Withdrew from qualification | | | | | | | | |
| (Brazil) 2027 | To be determined | | | | | | | | |
| Total | 0/9 | - | - | - | - | - | - | - | - |

*Draws include knockout matches decided on penalty kicks.

==== Olympic Games ====
Summer Olympics record
| Year | Round | GP | W | D | L | GF | GA | GD |
|---|---|---|---|---|---|---|---|---|
| (United States) 1996 to (Greece) 2004 | Did not enter | | | | | | | |
| (China) 2008 | Did not qualify | | | | | | | |
| (United Kingdom) 2012 | Did not qualify | | | | | | | |
| (Brazil) 2016 | Did not qualify | | | | | | | |
| (Japan) 2020 | Did not qualify | | | | | | | |
| (France) 2024 | Did not qualify | | | | | | | |
| (United States) 2028 | To be determined | | | | | | | |
| (Australia) 2032 | To be determined | | | | | | | |
| Total | 0/8 | 0 | 0 | 0 | 0 | 0 | 0 | 0 |

==== AFC Women's Asian Cup ====
AFC Women's Asian Cup record
| Year | Result | Position | Pld | W | D* | L | GF | GA | GD |
|---|---|---|---|---|---|---|---|---|---|
| (Hong Kong) 1975 | Did not enter | | | | | | | | |
| (Taiwan) 1977 | Did not enter | | | | | | | | |
| (India) 1980 | Runners-up | 2nd | 7 | 4 | 2 | 1 | 8 | 3 | +5 |
| (Hong Kong) 1981 | Third place | 3rd | 5 | 3 | 1 | 1 | 15 | 1 | +14 |
| (Thailand) 1983 | Runners-up | 2nd | 6 | 4 | 0 | 2 | 11 | 5 | +6 |
| (Hong Kong) 1986 | Did not enter | | | | | | | | |
| (Hong Kong) 1989 | Did not enter | | | | | | | | |
| (Japan) 1991 | Did not enter | | | | | | | | |
| (Malaysia) 1993 | Did not enter | | | | | | | | |
| (Malaysia) 1995 | Group stage | 10th | 3 | 0 | 0 | 3 | 3 | 12 | −9 |
| (China) 1997 | Group stage | 5th | 3 | 2 | 0 | 1 | 13 | 1 | +12 |
| (Philippines) 1999 | Group stage | 11th | 4 | 1 | 0 | 3 | 3 | 12 | −9 |
| (Chinese Taipei) 2001 | Group stage | 9th | 4 | 1 | 0 | 3 | 3 | 13 | −10 |
| (Thailand) 2003 | Group stage | 9th | 3 | 1 | 0 | 2 | 7 | 14 | −7 |
| (Australia) 2006 | Did not qualify | | | | | | | | |
| (Vietnam) 2008 | Did not qualify | | | | | | | | |
| (China) 2010 | Did not enter | | | | | | | | |
| (Vietnam) 2014 | Did not qualify | | | | | | | | |
| (Jordan) 2018 | Did not qualify | | | | | | | | |
| (India) 2022 | Originally qualified as host, withdrew due to COVID-19 pandemic inside the team. | | | | | | | | |
| (Australia) 2026 | To be determined | | | | | | | | |
| (Uzbekistan) 2029 | To be determined | | | | | | | | |
| Total | 9/19 | 0 titles | 35 | 16 | 3 | 16 | 63 | 61 | +2 |

Notes:

AFC Women's Asian Cup history
| Year | Round | Score | Result |
|---|---|---|---|
| 1980 | Round 1 | India S 2–0 Western Australia | Won |
| 1980 | Round 1 | India S 2–0 Hong Kong | Won |
| 1980 | Round 1 | India S 0–0 Chinese Taipei | Draw |
| 1980 | Round 1 | India S 1–0 India N | Won |
| 1980 | Round 1 | India S 0–0 Malaysia | Draw |
| 1980 | Semi-final | India S 3–1 Hong Kong | Won |
| 1980 | Final | India S 0–2 Chinese Taipei | Lost |
| 1981 | Round 1 | India 5–0 Singapore | Won |
| 1981 | Round 1 | India 8–0 Philippines | Won |
| 1981 | Round 1 | India 0–0 Hong Kong | Draw |
| 1981 | Semi-final | India 0–1 Thailand | Lost |
| 1981 | 3rd Place | India 2–0 Hong Kong | Won |
| 1983 | Round 1 | India 5–0 Philippines | Won |
| 1983 | Round 1 | India 1–0 Hong Kong | Won |
| 1983 | Round 1 | India 3–0 Malaysia | Won |
| 1983 | Round 1 | India 1–2 Thailand | Lost |
| 1983 | Round 1 | India 1–0 Singapore | Won |
| 1983 | Final | India 0–2 Thailand | Lost |
| 1995 | Round 1 | India 0–1 Uzbekistan | Lost |
| 1995 | Round 1 | India 0–6 Japan | Lost |
| 1995 | Round 1 | India 0–5 South Korea | Lost |
| 1997 | Round 1 | India 3–0 Hong Kong | Won |
| 1997 | Round 1 | India 0–1 Japan | Lost |
| 1997 | Round 1 | India 10–0 Guam | Won |
| 1999 | Round 1 | India 0–7 North Korea | Lost |
| 1999 | Round 1 | India 3–0 Malaysia | Won |
| 1999 | Round 1 | India 0–3 Vietnam | Lost |
| 1999 | Round 1 | India 0–3 Chinese Taipei | Lost |
| 2001 | Round 1 | India 0–7 South Korea | Lost |
| 2001 | Round 1 | India 0–5 Chinese Taipei | Lost |
| 2001 | Round 1 | India 0–1 Thailand | Lost |
| 2001 | Round 1 | India 3–0 Malaysia | Won |
| 2003 | Round 1 | India 6–0 Uzbekistan | Won |
| 2003 | Round 1 | India 0–12 China | Lost |
| 2003 | Round 1 | India 1–2 Vietnam | Lost |
| 2022 | Round 1 | India 0–0 Iran | Voided |
| 2022 | Round 1 | India n/a Chinese Taipei | Cancelled |
| 2022 | Round 1 | India n/a China | Cancelled |

*Draws include knockout matches decided on penalty kicks.
At 1979 AFC Asia Cup India placed two teams, India Senior (India S) and India Novice (India N), in other version called as India North and India South.

==== Asian Games ====
Asian Games record
| Year | Result | Position | Pld | W | D* | L | GF | GA | GD |
|---|---|---|---|---|---|---|---|---|---|
| (China) 1990 | DNP | | | | | | | | |
| (Japan) 1994 | DNP | | | | | | | | |
| (Thailand) 1998 | Group stage | 8th | 3 | 0 | 0 | 3 | 1 | 36 | −35 |
| (South Korea) 2002 | Did not enter | | | | | | | | |
| (Qatar) 2006 | Did not enter | | | | | | | | |
| (China) 2010 | Did not enter | | | | | | | | |
| (South Korea) 2014 | Group stage | 9th | 3 | 1 | 0 | 2 | 15 | 20 | −5 |
| (Indonesia) 2018 | Did not enter | | | | | | | | |
| (China) 2022 | Group stage | 13th | 2 | 0 | 0 | 2 | 1 | 3 | −2 |
| Total | 3/9 | 0 titles | 8 | 1 | 0 | 7 | 17 | 59 | −42 |

Asian Games history
| Year | Round | Score | Result |
|---|---|---|---|
| 1998 | Round 1 | India 0–7 South Korea | Loss |
| 1998 | Round 1 | India 1–13 Chinese Taipei | cLoss |
| 1998 | Round 1 | India 0–16 China | Loss |
| 2014 | Round 1 | India 15–0 Maldives | Won |
| 2014 | Round 1 | India 0–10 South Korea | Loss |
| 2014 | Round 1 | India 0–10 Thailand | Loss |
| 2022 | Round 1 | India 1–2 Chinese Taipei | Loss |
| 2022 | Round 1 | India 0–1 Thailand | Loss |

- DNQ: did not qualify

Bold positions show best finish in the tournaments.

==== SAFF Women's Championship ====
India has won the SAFF Women's Championship five times in a row.

SAFF Women's Championship record
| Year | Result | Position | Pld | W | D* | L | GF | GA | GD |
|---|---|---|---|---|---|---|---|---|---|
| (Bangladesh) 2010 | Winners | 1st place, gold medalist(s) | 5 | 5 | 0 | 0 | 40 | 0 | +40 |
| (Sri Lanka) 2012 | Winners | 1st place, gold medalist(s) | 5 | 5 | 0 | 0 | 33 | 1 | +32 |
| (Pakistan) 2014 | Winners | 1st place, gold medalist(s) | 5 | 5 | 0 | 0 | 36 | 1 | +35 |
| (India) 2016 | Winners | 1st place, gold medalist(s) | 4 | 3 | 1 | 0 | 11 | 3 | +8 |
| (Nepal) 2019 | Winners | 1st place, gold medalist(s) | 4 | 4 | 0 | 0 | 18 | 1 | +17 |
| (Nepal) 2022 | Semi-final | 3rd place, bronze medalist(s) | 4 | 2 | 0 | 2 | 12 | 4 | +8 |
| (Nepal) 2024 | TBD | TBD | 0 | 0 | 0 | 0 | 0 | 0 | 0 |
| Total | 6/6 | 5 titles | 27 | 24 | 1 | 2 | 150 | 10 | +140 |

==== South Asian Games ====
India has won the South Asian Games three times.

South Asian Games record
| Year | Result | Position | Pld | W | D* | L | GF | GA | GD |
|---|---|---|---|---|---|---|---|---|---|
| (Bangladesh) 2010 | Winners | 1st place, gold medalist(s) | 5 | 5 | 0 | 0 | 29 | 2 | +27 |
| (India) 2016 | Winners | 1st place, gold medalist(s) | 5 | 3 | 2 | 0 | 14 | 1 | +13 |
| (Nepal) 2019 | Winners | 1st place, gold medalist(s) | 4 | 4 | 0 | 0 | 14 | 0 | +14 |
| Total | 3/3 | 3 titles | 14 | 12 | 2 | 0 | 57 | 3 | +54 |

Red border indicates, India had hosted the games.

==== Other tournaments ====
Other Tournaments
| Gold Cup | Turkish Women's Cup | Torneio Internacional de Futebol Feminino |
|---|---|---|
| (India) 2019: 3rd place | (Turkey) 2019: 6th place; (Turkey) 2021: Friendlies; (Turkey) 2024: (silver) Runners-up | (Brazil) 2021: 4th place |

== Football broadcast in India ==
=== Domestic competitions ===
==== Domestic state football ====
List of current broadcasters:

| Competition | Period | Television rights | | Streaming rights | |
| Competition | Period | Conglomerate | Channel(s) | Conglomerate | Platform |
|---|---|---|---|---|---|
| Santosh Trophy | 2024–25 | None | | Shrachi Sports Endeavour Private Limited | SSEN |
| Senior Women's NFC | 2024–25 | None | | Shrachi Sports Endeavour Private Limited | SSEN |
| National Beach Soccer Championship | 2023 | None | | AIFF | Indian Football |

==== Domestic club football ====
List of current broadcasters:

| Competition | Period | Television rights | | Streaming rights | |
| Competition | Period | Conglomerate | Channel(s) | Conglomerate | Platform |
|---|---|---|---|---|---|
| Indian Super League | 2024-25 | JioStar | Star Sports, Asianet Plus | JioStar | JioHotstar |
| I-League | 2024-25 | Culver Max Entertainment | Sony Sports Network | Shrachi Sports Endeavour Private Limited | SSEN |
| I-League 2 | 2024-25 | None | | AIFF | Indian Football |
| I-League 3 | 2024-25 | None | | AIFF | Indian Football |
| Indian Women's League | 2025 | None | | Shrachi Sports Endeavour Private Limited | SSEN |
| Indian Women's League 2 | 2024-25 | None | | AIFF | Indian Football |
| Super Cup | 2025 | JioStar | Star Sports | JioStar | JioHotstar |
| Durand Cup | 2025-27 | Culver Max Entertainment | Sony Sports Network | Culver Max Entertainment | Sony LIV |
| Futsal Club Championship | 2023-24 | None | | AIFF | Indian Football |

==== Domestic state football competition ====
===== Leagues =====
List of current broadcasters:

| State | League | Period | Television rights | | Streaming rights | |
| State | League | Period | Conglomerate | Channel(s) | Conglomerate | Platform |
|---|---|---|---|---|---|---|
| West Bengal | Calcutta Football League | 2025 | None | | Shrachi Sports Endeavour Private Limited | SSEN |

===== Franchise leagues =====
List of current broadcasters:

| State | Competition | Period | Television rights | | Streaming rights | |
| State | Competition | Period | Conglomerate | Channel(s) | Conglomerate | Platform |
|---|---|---|---|---|---|---|
| Kerala | Super League Kerala | 2024 | JioStar | Star Sports | JioStar | JioHotstar |
| Gujarat | Gujarat Super League | 2024 | None | | FIFA, GSFA | FIFA+, GSFA |
| West Bengal | Bengal Super League | 2025-35 | Zee Entertainment Enterprises | Zee Bangla Cinema | Zee Entertainment Enterprises | Zee5 |

=== International competitions ===
==== International football (Home) ====
List of current broadcasters:

| Competition | Period | Television rights | | Streaming rights | |
| Competition | Period | Conglomerate | Channel(s) | Conglomerate | Platform |
|---|---|---|---|---|---|
| Intercontinental Cup | 2024 | JioStar | Star Sports | JioStar | JioHotstar |
| Tri-Nation Series | 2023 | JioStar | Star Sports | JioStar | JioHotstar |
| Gold Cup | | TBD | | | |

==== International football (Away) ====
List of current broadcasters:

| Federation (or) Confederation | Competition | Period | Television Rights | | Streaming Rights | |
| Federation (or) Confederation | Competition | Period | Conglomerate | Channel(s) | Conglomerate | Platform |
|---|---|---|---|---|---|---|
| FIFA | FIFA World Cup | 2022 | JioStar | Star Sports | JioStar | JioHotstar |
| FIFA | FIFA World Cup | 2022 | JioStar | Star Sports | Jio Platforms | Jio TV |
| FIFA | FIFA U-20 World Cup | 2023 | None | | FIFA | FIFA+ |
| FIFA | FIFA U-17 World Cup | 2023 | None | | Dream Sports | FanCode |
| FIFA | FIFA Women's World Cup | 2023 | Doordarshan | DD Sports | Dream Sports | FanCode |
| FIFA | FIFA U-20 Women's World Cup | 2022 | JioStar | Star Sports | JioStar | JioHotstar |
| FIFA | FIFA U-17 Women's World Cup | 2022 | JioStar | Star Sports | Jio Platforms | Jio TV |
| AFC | AFC Asian Cup | 2027 | None | | Dream Sports | FanCode |
| AFC | AFC Asian Cup qualifiers | 2025 | JioStar | Star Sports | Dream Sports | FanCode |
| AFC | FIFA World Cup Qualifiers – AFC | 2024 | None | | Dream Sports | FanCode |
| AFC | AFC U-23 Asian Cup | 2026-28 | None | | Dream Sports | FanCode |
| AFC | AFC U-20 Asian Cup | 2025-27 | None | | Dream Sports | FanCode |
| AFC | AFC U-17 Asian Cup | 2025-27 | None | | Dream Sports | FanCode |
| AFC | AFC Women's Asian Cup | 2026 | None | | Dream Sports | FanCode |
| AFC | AFC Women's Asian Cup qualifiers | 2025 | None | | Thai Women’s Football Facebook Page, Changsuek Official | |
| AFC | AFC Women's Olympic Qualifying Tournament | 2028 | None | | Dream Sports | FanCode |
| AFC | AFC U-20 Women's Asian Cup | 2025-27 | None | | Dream Sports | FanCode |
| AFC | AFC U-17 Women's Asian Cup | 2026-28 | None | | Dream Sports | FanCode |
| SAFF | SAFF Championship | 2023 | Doordarshan | DD Sports | Dream Sports | FanCode |
| SAFF | SAFF U-20 Championship | 2025 | None | | Sportzworkz | |
| SAFF | SAFF U-17 Championship | 2024 | None | | Sportzworkz | |
| SAFF | SAFF Women's Championship | 2024 | None | | Dream Sports | FanCode |
| SAFF | SAFF U-20 Women's Championship | 2025 | None | | Sportzworkz | |
| SAFF | SAFF U-17 Women's Championship | 2024 | None | | Sportzworkz | |
| UEFA | UEFA Euro | 2023-28 | Culver Max Entertainment | Sony Sports | Culver Max Entertainment | SonyLIV |
| UEFA | UEFA Nations League | 2023-28 | Culver Max Entertainment | Sony Sports | Culver Max Entertainment | SonyLIV |
| UEFA | UEFA Euro Qualifiers | 2023-28 | Culver Max Entertainment | Sony Sports | Culver Max Entertainment | SonyLIV |
| UEFA | FIFA World Cup Qualifiers – UEFA | 2025-26 | Culver Max Entertainment | Sony Sports | Culver Max Entertainment | SonyLIV |
| UEFA | UEFA Women's Euro | 2025 | None | | Dream Sports | FanCode |
| CONMEBOL | Copa América | 2024 | None | | Dream Sports | FanCode |
| CONMEBOL | FIFA World Cup Qualifiers – CONMEBOL | 2025 | None | | Dream Sports | FanCode |
| CAF | Africa Cup of Nations | 2023 | None | | Dream Sports | FanCode |
| CAF | FIFA World Cup Qualifiers – CAF | 2023-25 | None | | Dream Sports | FanCode |
| CONCACAF | CONCACAF Gold Cup | 2025 | None | | Dream Sports | FanCode |
| CONCACAF | FIFA World Cup Qualifiers – CONCACAF | 2021-22 | None | | Dream Sports | FanCode |

==== International club football ====
List of current broadcasters:

| Country (or) Confederation | Competition | Period | Television Rights | | Streaming Rights | |
| Country (or) Confederation | Competition | Period | Conglomerate | Channel(s) | Conglomerate | Platform |
|---|---|---|---|---|---|---|
| FIFA | FIFA Club World Cup | 2025 | WBD India | Eurosport India | Dream Sports | FanCode |
| FIFA | FIFA Club World Cup | 2025 | WBD India | Eurosport India | Access Industries | DAZN |
| FIFA | FIFA Intercontinental Cup | 2024 | None | | FIFA | FIFA+ |
| AFC | AFC Champions League Elite | 2025-29 | None | | Dream Sports | FanCode |
| AFC | AFC Champions League Two | 2025-29 | None | | Dream Sports | FanCode |
| AFC | AFC Challenge League | 2024-25 | None | | Paro FC Youtube Channel | |
| AFC | AFC Women's Champions League | 2024-29 | None | | Dream Sports | FanCode |
| UEFA | UEFA Champions League | 2023-28 | Culver Max Entertainment | Sony Sports | Culver Max Entertainment | SonyLIV |
| UEFA | UEFA Europa League | 2023-28 | Culver Max Entertainment | Sony Sports | Culver Max Entertainment | SonyLIV |
| UEFA | UEFA Europa Conference League | 2023-28 | Culver Max Entertainment | Sony Sports | Culver Max Entertainment | SonyLIV |
| UEFA | UEFA Super Cup | 2023-28 | Culver Max Entertainment | Sony Sports | Culver Max Entertainment | SonyLIV |
| UEFA | UEFA Women's Champions League | 2021-25 | None | | Access Industries | DAZN, DAZN Women's Football |
| CONCACAF | CONCACAF Champions Cup | 2025 | None | | Dream Sports | FanCode |
| CONCACAF | Leagues Cup | 2023 | None | | Apple | Apple TV+ (MLS Season Pass) |
| England | Premier League | 2025-28 | JioStar | Star Sports | JioStar | JioHotstar |
| England | FA Cup | 2024-25 | Culver Max Entertainment | Sony Sports | Culver Max Entertainment | SonyLIV |
| England | FA Community Shield | 2024-25 | Culver Max Entertainment | Sony Sports | Culver Max Entertainment | SonyLIV |
| England | EFL Cup | 2024-25 | None | | Dream Sports | FanCode |
| England | EFL Championship | 2024-25 | None | | Dream Sports | FanCode |
| England | EFL League One | 2024-25 | None | | Dream Sports | FanCode |
| England | EFL League Two | 2024-25 | None | | Dream Sports | FanCode |
| England | Women's Super League | 2022-24 | None | | Dream Sports | FanCode |
| France | Ligue 1 | 2024-28 | None | | Galaxy Racer | GXR |
| France | Ligue 2 | 2024-25 | None | | Galaxy Racer | GXR |
| France | Coupe de France | 2024 | None | | Access Industries | DAZN |
| Germany | Bundesliga | 2023-26 | Culver Max Entertainment | Sony Sports | Culver Max Entertainment | SonyLIV |
| Germany | DFB-Pokal | 2025 | Doordarshan | DD Sports | Prasar Bharati | Waves |
| Italy | Serie A | 2024-28 | None | | Galaxy Racer | GXR |
| Italy | Coppa Italia | 2024-25 | None | | Galaxy Racer | GXR |
| Italy | Supercoppa Italiana | 2024-25 | None | | Galaxy Racer | GXR |
| Netherlands | Eredivisie | 2020-25 | WBD India | Eurosport India | WBD India | Discovery+ |
| Scotland | Scottish Premiership | 2020-25 | JioStar | Star Sports | JioStar | JioHotstar |
| Scotland | Scottish League Cup | 2020-25 | JioStar | Star Sports | JioStar | JioHotstar |
| Scotland | Scottish Championship | 2020-25 | JioStar | Star Sports | JioStar | JioHotstar |
| Spain | La Liga | 2024-30 | None | | Dream Sports | FanCode |
| Spain | Segunda Division | None | None | | None | |
| Spain | Copa del Rey | 2024-25 | None | | Dream Sports | FanCode |
| Spain | Supercopa de España | 2024-25 | None | | Dream Sports | FanCode |
| Spain | Liga F | 2022-27 | None | | Access Industries | DAZN, DAZN Women's Football |
| China | Chinese Super League | 2025 | None | | Dream Sports | FanCode |
| Japan | J1 League | 2025 | None | | Dream Sports | FanCode |
| Australia | A-League Men | 2024-25 | None | | Dream Sports | FanCode |
| Saudi Arabia | Saudi Pro League | 2024-25 | Culver Max Entertainment | Sony Sports | Culver Max Entertainment | SonyLIV |
| Saudi Arabia | King Cup | 2024-25 | Culver Max Entertainment | Sony Sports | Culver Max Entertainment | SonyLIV |
| Saudi Arabia | Saudi Super Cup | 2024 | Culver Max Entertainment | Sony Sports | Culver Max Entertainment | SonyLIV |
| United States | Major League Soccer | 2025 | WBD India | Eurosport India | Apple | Apple TV+ (MLS Season Pass) |
| United States | U.S. Open Cup | 2023 | Culver Max Entertainment | Sony Sports | Culver Max Entertainment | SonyLIV |

== Clubs on social media ==
Kerala Blasters ranked fifth most popular Asian club on social media as of 31 October 2018. Note that the Chinese football clubs Guangzhou FC, Shandong Taishan, Beijing Guoan, the Tianjin Jinmen Tiger and Shanghai Shenhua ranked above the Kerala Blasters with millions of followers on Weibo.

| # | Club | Country | Followers |
|---|---|---|---|
| 1 | Persib | Indonesia | 15.4 million |
| 2 | Al-Hilal | Saudi Arabia | 11.3 million |
| 3 | Al-Ittihad | Saudi Arabia | 4.6 million |
| 4 | Persija | Indonesia | 4.2 million |
| 5 | Kerala Blasters | India | 3.6 million |

== Attendances ==
The average attendance per top-flight football league season and the club with the highest average attendance:

| Season | League average | Best club | Best club average |
|---|---|---|---|
| 2024–25 | 11,086 | Mohun Bagan | 35,744 |
| 2023–24 | 11,489 | Mohun Bagan | 34,790 |
| 2022–23 | 12,099 | Kerala Blasters | 27,825 |
| 2018–19 | 13,155 | Jamshedpur FC | 20,016 |
| 2017–18 | 15,047 | Kerala Blasters | 31,763 |
| 2016 | 21,003 | Kerala Blasters | 60,256 |
| 2015 | 27,111 | Kerala Blasters | 52,008 |
| 2014 | 26,505 | Kerala Blasters | 49,111 |

== Seasons ==
The following articles detail the major results and events in each season of Indian football since 2011.

| 2010s: | 2011–12 | 2012–13 | 2013–14 | 2014–15 | 2015–16 | 2016–17 | 2017–18 | 2018–19 | 2019–20 |
| 2020s: | 2020–21 | 2021–22 | 2022–23 | 2023–24 | 2024–25 | 2025–26 | 2026–27 | | |

== National Sports Award recipients ==
| Year | Recipient | Award | Gender |
|---|---|---|---|
| 2021 | Sunil Chhetri | Major Dhyan Chand Khel Ratna | Male |
| 1961 | P. K. Banerjee | Arjuna Award | Male |
| 1962 | Tulsidas Balaram | Arjuna Award | Male |
| 1963 | Chuni Goswami | Arjuna Award | Male |
| 1964 | Jarnail Singh | Arjuna Award | Male |
| 1965 | Arun Ghosh | Arjuna Award | Male |
| 1966 | Yousuf Khan | Arjuna Award | Male |
| 1967 | Peter Thangaraj | Arjuna Award | Male |
| 1969 | Inder Singh | Arjuna Award | Male |
| 1970 | Syed Nayeemuddin | Arjuna Award | Male |
| 1971 | C. P. Singh | Arjuna Award | Male |
| 1973 | Magan Singh Rajvi | Arjuna Award | Male |
| 1978–1979 | Gurdev Singh Gill | Arjuna Award | Male |
| 1979–1980 | Prasun Banerjee | Arjuna Award | Male |
| 1980–1981 | Mohammed Habib | Arjuna Award | Male |
| 1981 | Sudhir Karmakar | Arjuna Award | Male |
| 1983 | Shanti Mullick | Arjuna Award | Female |
| 1989 | Subrata Bhattacharya | Arjuna Award | Male |
| 1997 | Brahmanand Sankhwalkar | Arjuna Award | Male |
| 1998 | Bhaichung Bhutia | Arjuna Award | Male |
| 2001 | Bruno Coutinho | Arjuna Award | Male |
| 2002 | I. M. Vijayan | Arjuna Award | Male |
| 2010 | Deepak Mondal | Arjuna Award | Male |
| 2011 | Sunil Chhetri | Arjuna Award | Male |
| 2016 | Subrata Pal | Arjuna Award | Male |
| 2017 | Oinam Bembem Devi | Arjuna Award | Female |
| 2019 | Gurpreet Singh Sandhu | Arjuna Award | Male |
| 2020 | Sandesh Jhingan | Arjuna Award | Male |
| 2011 | Shabbir Ali | Dhyan Chand Award | Male |
| 2017 | Syed Shahid Hakim | Dhyan Chand Award | Male |
| 2020 | Sukhvinder Singh Sandhu | Dhyan Chand Award | Male |
| 1990 | Syed Nayeemuddin | Dronacharya Award | Male |
| 2022 | Bimal Prafulla Ghosh | Dronacharya Award | Male |

== See also ==
- Sport in India
- Football in Asia
- History of the India national football team
- All India Sevens Football
- AIFF Player of the Year Awards
- Futsal Association of India
- Junior National Football Championship
- Football in West Bengal
- Kolkata derby
- List of football clubs in India
- List of Indian players in foreign leagues

=== In popular culture ===
- Goal (2007)
- Maidaan (2023), Hindi movie of Ajay Devgn about Indian football's golden era of the 1950s.
- List of movies made on 'Football sport' in India
- List of Indian sport movies
