= 2023 National Beach Soccer Championship =

Association football tournament in India

Tournament details
- Country: India
- Venue(s): Dumas Beach, Surat
- Dates: 26 January–1 February 2023
- Teams: 19

Final positions
- Champions: Kerala (1st title)
- Runner-up: Punjab
- Third place: Delhi
- Fourth place: Uttarakhand

Tournament statistics
- Matches played: 80
- Goals scored: 552 (6.9 per match)
- Top goal scorer(s): Amit Godara (Rajasthan) (27 goals)

Awards
- Best player: Siju S (Kerala)
- Best goalkeeper: Santhosh Kasmeer (Kerala)

The 2023 National Beach Soccer Championship was the inaugural edition of the National Beach Soccer Championship, an annual Beach soccer tournament in India organised by the All India Football Federation (AIFF).

== Group stage ==
AIFF announced schedule of this tournament on 24 January 2023. Later, Services has been replaced by Punjab. Also Manipur, who was initially drawn in group C, withdrew.

=== Group A ===
Pos	Team	Pld	W	D	L	GF	GA	GD	Pts	Qualification	LD	JH	BR	HP	AN
1	Lakshadweep	4	4	0	0	54	20	+34	12	Knockout stage	—	—	9–5	—	13–4
2	Jharkhand	4	3	0	1	28	28	0	9	Knockout stage	6–16	—	—	6–5	—
3	Bihar	4	2	0	2	27	27	0	6		—	2–9	—	—	12–7
4	Himachal Pradesh	4	1	0	3	18	35	−17	3		5–16	—	2–8	—	—
5	Andaman & Nicobar	4	0	0	4	21	38	−17	0		—	5–7	—	5–6	—

Source: AIFF
Rules for classification: Group stage tiebreakers

=== Group B ===
Pos	Team	Pld	W	D	L	GF	GA	GD	Pts	Qualification	PB	KL	GJ	RJ	MP
1	Punjab	4	3	0	1	30	18	+12	9	Knockout stage	—	6–5	2–2 (4-5)	—	—
2	Kerala	4	3	0	1	47	9	+38	9	Knockout stage	—	—	—	19–2	17–1
3	Gujarat (H)	4	3	0	1	21	18	+3	9		—	0–6	—	8–6	11–4
4	Rajasthan	4	1	0	3	45	43	+2	3		8–11	—	—	—	29–5
5	Madhya Pradesh	4	0	0	4	13	68	−55	0		3–11	—	—	—	—

Source: AIFF
Rules for classification: Group stage tiebreakers
(H) Hosts

=== Group C ===
Pos	Team	Pld	W	D	L	GF	GA	GD	Pts	Qualification	UT	DL	MZ	AP
1	Uttarakhand	3	3	0	0	23	10	+13	9	Knockout stage	—	—	7–4	—
2	Delhi	3	2	0	1	17	18	−1	6	Knockout stage	4–7	—	7–6	—
3	Mizoram	3	1	0	2	17	18	−1	3		—	—	—	7–4
4	Andhra Pradesh	3	0	0	3	11	22	−11	0		2–9	5–6	—	—

Source: AIFF
Rules for classification: Group stage tiebreakers

=== Group D ===
Pos	Team	Pld	W	D	L	GF	GA	GD	Pts	Qualification	OR	AR	KA	DH	GA
1	Odisha	4	3	0	1	26	12	+14	9	Knockout stage	—	7–3	7–3	—	—
2	Arunachal Pradesh	4	3	0	1	22	17	+5	9	Knockout stage	—	—	—	8–2	7–6
3	Karnataka	4	2	0	2	15	17	−2	6		—	2–4	—	6–2	—
4	Dadra and Nagar Haveli & Daman and Diu	4	1	0	3	11	27	−16	3		2–10	—	—	—	5–3
5	Goa	4	1	0	3	17	18	−1	3		4–2	—	4–4	—	—

Source: AIFF
Rules for classification: Group stage tiebreakers

== Knockout stage ==
=== Bracket ===
Quarter-finals
31 January
Lakshadweep	0
Kerala	5
31 January
Uttarakhand	13
Arunachal Pradesh	5
31 January
Punjab	6
Jharkhand	4
31 January
Odisha	5 (1)
Delhi	5 (3)

Semi-finals
31 January
Kerala	11
Uttarakhand	9
31 January
Punjab	3
Delhi	2

Final
1 February
Kerala	13
Punjab	4
Third place
1 February
Uttarakhand	1
Delhi	3

=== Quarter-finals ===
31 January 2023
09:00 IST

Lakshadweep	0–5	Kerala
	Report	Saju S 14'; Stephin J 16', 31'; Suhail U 33', 34'

Arena 1
31 January 2023
09:00 IST

Uttarakhand	13–5	Arunachal Pradesh
Mary Jesin Shagin S 2', 8', 16', 20', 20', 21'; Tijo S Theofin 6', 12'; Aron A 8', 16', 25'; Sarshan C 31'; Tushan D 34'	Report	Tasar Negia Dignium 10'; Tolum Pinku 15'; Dorjee Tsewang 16'; Bishal Munda 17'; Dorjee Sherpa 27'

Arena 2
31 January 2023
11:00 IST

Punjab	6–4	Jharkhand
Sangamdeep Singh 24', 32'; Sanamdeep 15', 16', 32'	Report	Shivanand Nath Gonjhu 3'; Akash Chandra Mahato 11'; Birju Baskey 19'; Akash Chandra Mahato 27'; Mahesh Murmu 26' (o.g.)

Arena 1
31 January 2023
11:00 IST

Odisha	5–5	Delhi
Bapuni Bindhani 9', 22', 26', 37'; Subash Pujari 14'	Report	Satyam Vivek 14', 27'; Sandeep 28'; Amit Bisht 35'; Lalzarmawia 38'
Penalties
	1–3

Arena 2

=== Semi-finals ===
31 January 2023
15:00 IST

Kerala	11–9	Uttarakhand
Stephin J 1', 13', 35'; Jikson K V 3', 9', 10', 34', 35'; Suhail U 10', 21'; Saju S 12'	Report	Mary Jesin Shagin S 4', 19', 20', 32', 32'; Tushan D 6'; Sarshan C 11', 23'; Tijo S Theofin 17'

Arena 2
31 January 2023
16:00 IST

Punjab	3–2	Delhi
Palwinder Singh 6'; Kartik 17'; Sangamdeep Singh 35'	Report	Satyam Vivek 8'; Tanmay Prasad 9'

Arena 2

=== 3rd place ===
1 February 2023
10:00 IST

Uttarakhand	1–3	Delhi
Mary Jesin Shagin S 5'	Report	Satyam Vivek 3'; Amit Bisht 21'; Sunny Chaudhary 34'

Arena 2

=== Final ===
1 February 2023
16:00 IST

Kerala	13–4	Punjab
Kamaludheen A 1'; Siju S 5'; Suhail U 7', 12'; Jikson K V 8', 30', 33'; Stephin J 13', 14'; Muhseer Tkb 17', 21'; Roy R 24', 30'	Report	Jikson K V 6' (o.g.); Akash Babu 7'; Siju S 28' (o.g.); Rajwinder Singh 35'

Arena 2

== Broadcasting ==
On 28 January 2023, All India Football Federation (AIFF) announced through Twitter that, matches of knockout stage would be broadcast via official Facebook page and YouTube channel of Indian Football.

== See also ==
- 2022–23 Santosh Trophy
- 2022–23 Futsal Club Championship
