= Sarada Muraleedharan =

Indian civil servant

Chief Secretary of Kerala
- In office 1 September 2024 – 30 April 2025
- Preceded by: V. Venu
- Succeeded by: A. Jayathilak

Personal details
- Born: April 17, 1965 (age 60)
- Spouse: V. Venu
- Occupation: Civil servant

Sarada Muraleedharan (born 17 April 1965) is a retired civil servant of the Indian Administrative Service (IAS) of Kerala cadre (1990 batch). She served as the 49th Chief secretary of Kerala from 1 September 2024 to 30 April 2025.

During her career, Muraleedharan held senior positions in the Government of Kerala and on central deputation, including serving as Executive Director of the Kudumbashree Mission (2006–2012), Chief Operating Officer of the National Rural Livelihoods Mission, Joint Secretary in the Union Ministry of Panchayati Raj, and Director General of the National Institute of Fashion Technology (NIFT).

== Early life and education ==
Muraleedharan is from Thiruvananthapuram, Kerala. She attended the Government College for Women, Thiruvananthapuram.

== Career ==
Muraleedharan joined the Indian Administrative Service in 1990 and was allotted the Kerala cadre.

=== District administration ===
She served as District Collector of Thiruvananthapuram from 18 September 1998 to 18 October 2000.

=== Kudumbashree Mission ===
Muraleedharan served as Executive Director of the Kudumbashree Mission from 12 June 2006 to 1 May 2012.

=== State and central government roles ===
On central deputation, she served as Chief Operating Officer of the National Rural Livelihoods Mission under the Ministry of Rural Development, and later as Joint Secretary in the Union Ministry of Panchayati Raj, where she worked on the promotion of Gram Panchayat Development Plans.

=== Director General, NIFT ===
In 2016, Muraleedharan was appointed Director General of the National Institute of Fashion Technology (NIFT).

=== Chief Secretary of Kerala (2024–2025) ===
In August 2024, the Kerala cabinet appointed Muraleedharan as Chief Secretary. She assumed office on 1 September 2024, succeeding the outgoing Chief Secretary, V. Venu (her spouse), who retired on 31 August 2024.

Media coverage noted that while IAS couples had previously both served as Kerala chief secretaries at different times, this was the first instance in the state where the office passed directly from one spouse to the other.

Muraleedharan retired on 30 April 2025 and was succeeded by A. Jayathilak.

== Public statements ==
In March 2025, Muraleedharan received attention after a social media post in which she discussed colourism and gendered stereotyping, following commentary comparing her performance as chief secretary to that of her predecessor and spouse. The post was discussed in Indian media about discrimination linked to skin colour.

== Personal life ==
Muraleedharan is married to V. Venu, a retired IAS officer who served as Chief Secretary of Kerala immediately before her.
