= National Beach Soccer Championship =

Association football tournament in India

- Organiser(s): All India Football Federation
- Founded: 2023; 2 years ago
- Region: India
- Teams: 19
- Most championships: Kerala (1 title)
- Website: www.the-aiff.com

The National Beach Soccer Championship is an annual Beach soccer tournament in India, contested by the state associations under the All India Football Federation (AIFF), the sport's governing body in India.

== Seasons ==
The following is the list of winners and runners-up from every edition of the National Beach Soccer Championship.

| Year | Host city | First place game | | | Third place game | | | No. of Teams |
| Year | Host city | (gold) Champions | Score | (silver) Runners-up | (bronze) Third place | Score | Fourth place | No. of Teams |
|---|---|---|---|---|---|---|---|---|
| 2023 | Surat, Gujarat | Kerala | 13–4 | Punjab | Delhi | 3–1 | Uttarakhand | 19 |
| 2024 | Goa | Not held | | | | | | |

== See also ==
- Football in India
- Sport in India
- Futsal Club Championship
- AFC Beach Soccer Asian Cup
