= Paul Antony (civil servant) =

Indian politician

Chief Secretary, Government of Kerala
- In office January 2018 – June 2018
- Governor: Arif Mohammed Khan
- Chief Minister: Pinarayi Vijayan
- Preceded by: Dr. K. M. Abraham IAS
- Succeeded by: Tom Jose IAS

Personal details
- Born: 27 June 1958 (age 66); Kattoor, Thrissur district
- Occupation: Bureaucrat

Paul Antony (born 27 June 1958) is a senior Indian Administrative Service (IAS) officer from Kerala who retired as the Chief Secretary, Government of Kerala. He belongs to 1983 Batch. He is presently serving as the Chairman of Kerala State Industrial Development Corporation.

== Career ==
Antony started his career as Assistant Collector, Palakkad. He served as District Collector of Kollam and Alappuzha districts. He then served as Managing Director of Kerala State Civil Supplies Corporation, Development Commissioner of Cochin Export Processing Zone, Commissioner of Commercial Taxes, Principal Secretary in SC/ST Development Department and Power Department. He was the Chairman of Cochin Port Trust from 2011 to 2016. He then served as Chairman, Kerala State Electricity Board. He was Additional Chief Secretary of Commerce and Industries department and Forest and wildlife department before his tenure as Chief Secretary. He succeeded Dr. K. M. Abraham as the Chief Secretary of Kerala. Antony retired in June 2018. In September 2021, he was appointed as Chairman of KSIDC. Currently he is a member of Director Board of South Indian Bank.
