= V. P. Joy =

Indian poet, writer and researcher

Chief Secretary, Government of Kerala
- In office 28 February 2021 – June 2023
- Preceded by: Vishwas Mehta
- Succeeded by: Dr. V.Venu

Secretary (Coordination and Security), Government of India
- In office 1 January 2020 – 11 January 2021
- Preceded by: Rajesh Bhushan
- Succeeded by: Praveen Kumar Srivastava

Personal details
- Born: 30 June 1963 (age 63) Ernakulam, Kerala, India
- Education: College of Engineering, Trivandrum
- Occupation: Chairperson, Kerala Public Enterprises Selection and Recruitment Board.

Vazhayil Pathrose Joy, also known as Joy Vazhayil (born 30 June 1963), is an Indian poet, writer, researcher, and administrator. He is also known for books and research papers on the energy policy and also on philosophy of education, mind and metaphysics. He has published several literary works in Malayalam language, mainly poetic compositions.

During his official career spanning more than three and a half decades, he has held important assignments in the Government of India as well as in the State Government of Kerala.

Joy took charge as the Chief Secretary of State of Kerala, India on 28 February 2021 and demitted office on 30 June 2023. During this period, he has been instrumental in the e-Governance transformation of Kerala which declared total e-governance on 25 May 2023. He is from the 1987 batch of the Indian Administrative Service. Currently he is the Chairperson of Kerala Public Enterprises Selection and Recruitment Board.

== Early life and education ==
Joy was born to Aleyamma and V. V. Pathrose of the Vazhayil house in Ernakulam district, Kerala. After his early education, he graduated in Electronics & Communication Engineering from the College of Engineering, Thiruvananthapuram. Later he did an M.B.A. from the University of Birmingham and subsequently completed his M.Phil. from Panjab University, Chandigarh.

He was awarded doctoral degree from the Indian Institute of Technology, Delhi on Optimization of India's Energy Strategies for Climate Change Mitigation. He was selected as a Giorgio Ruffolo Post-doctoral Research Fellow in the Sustainability Science Program of Harvard University in 2014.

== Career ==
V. P. Joy joined the Vikram Sarabhai Space Center as Scientist/Engineer in 1985 and worked on the control and guidance of launch vehicles and developed the Guidance algorithm of the Polar Satellite Launch vehicle (PSLV).

In the Indian Administrative Service he held various senior positions in the Government of Kerala and the Government of India.

He started his career in the IAS as the Subcollector, Palakkad in 1989. Subsequently held the position of Head of Department in the departments of Scheduled Castes Development, Collegiate Education, General Education, Cooperation and Transport. He was the District Collector and District Magistrate of Ernakulam (1996-1999), KSEB Chairman (2011) and the Principal Finance Secretary of Kerala (2011-2013). In the Government of Kerala, he was Secretary in the departments of Taxes, Agriculture, Animal Husbandry, Dairy, Planning & Economic Affairs, Labour and Transport. In the Government of India, he held the positions of Director in the Ministry of Petroleum & Natural Gas, Joint Secretary in the Ministry of Power, Cabinet Secretariat and PMO, Hydrocarbons Director General, Central Provident Fund Commissioner of EPFO & Dean, National Academy of Social Security, Chairperson, National Authority of Chemical Weapons and Secretary in the Cabinet Secretariat in charge of Coordination and Security. He has been Chairman of KSFE, KSRTC, KINFRA and Director of Several companies including NTPC, Cochin Shipyard, Mangalore, Bongaigaon and Kochi refineries, Kochi and Kannur airports, Kochi Metro, KSIDC, Apollo Tyres etc.

Kerala effectively handled the second Covid wave minimising adverse impacts under his administrative leadership. He has been instrumental in several administrative reforms including implementation of total e-governance in Kerala. He has led several reforms in social and economic sectors including literacy and educational initiatives, service centric initiatives for ease of life and ease of doing business etc. both at the state and national levels. Leading the transformation of Employees Provident Fund Organisation (EPFO, India) during his tenure in electronic service delivery is a notable case this regard Similar transformation was achieved in the Directorate General of Hydrocarbons during his tenure (2018-2019) and also in the National Government Services Portal during 2020 under his leadership.

== Academic Associations ==
He has been Member, Syndicate of the Kerala (1992-1996), Mahatma Gandhi (1992-1996) and Calicut (1992-1996 and 2000-2002) Universities; Member, Senate of Cochin University of Science and Technology (1992-1996); Dean of the Deendayal Upadhyaya National Academy of Social Security (2016-2018); Governing Body member, Jesus and Mary College, Delhi (2018-2019); Member of Research Advisory Council of NTPC Energy Technology Research Alliance (NETRA) (2009-2012); Life Member, Indian Institute of Public Administration, Delhi; Chairperson, Institute of Management in Government, Kerala (2021-2023); Member of Governing Body, MA College of Engineering, Kothamangalam (2024–25); Honorary Professor, IIT, Palakkad (2023-2025) and Honorary Professor, IISER, Thiruvananthapuram (2025 Onwards).

== Literary Contributions ==
Joy Vazhayil has published fourteen poetic works, two novels and four translation works in Malayalam besides writing many articles.

Literary genres	Title	Publisher
Poems	Manalvarakaḷ	DC Books, Kottayam
Poems	Nimishajalakam	DC Books, Kottayam
Poems	Mathruvilapam	D.C.Books, Kottayam
Poems	Nilaanirjhari	Mathrubhumi Books, Kozhikode
Poems	Rithubhedangal	Mathrubhumi Books, Kozhikode
Poems	Ramanuthapam	Sahitya Pravarthaka Sahakarana Sangham (SPCS), Kottayam
Poems	Salabhayaanam	Sahitya Pravarthaka Sahakarana Sangham (SPCS), Kottayam
Poems	Malayala Gazal	Current Books, Thrissur
Poems	Niramezhuthum Porul	DeLight Books, Delhi
Poems	Mukthakangal, Samasyakal	DeLight Books, Delhi
Poems	Nakshatraragam	Jeevan Publications, Alappuzha
Poems	Veenakkambikal	Media Book House, Delhi
Poems	Kaanaamara	DC Books, Kottayam
Poems	Maunabhasha	Vallathol Vidyapeedam, Malappuram
Poems	Nakshathrangal Kozhiyumbol	Green Books, Thrissur
Novel	Arivaazham	Sahitya Pravarthaka Sahakarana Sangham (SPCS), Kottayam
Novel	Bandhanasthanaya Nyayadhipan	Media Book House, Delhi
Language Works	Vrithabodhini	Kerala Bhasha Institute, Thiruvananthapuram
Translations to Malayalam	Upanishad Kavyatharaavali	Mathrubhumi Books, Kerala
Translations to Malayalam	Taoismthinte Jnanappana	Kurukshetra Books, Ernakulam
Translations to Malayalam	Pravachakan	National Bookstall, Kerala
Translations to Malayalam	Venkalaroopiyaya Asvaroodan	Media Book House, Delhi
Multidisciplinary Works	Limits and Limitations of the Human Mind	Vikas Publishers, New Delhi, (1995)
Multidisciplinary Works	Facets of freedom	Concept Publishers, New Delhi (1997)
Multidisciplinary Works	Reflections on the Philosophy of Education	NCERT, New Delhi, (2002)

== Awards and honors ==
- S. K. Pottekkatt Award for the Poetry collection ‘Nimishajalakam’
- Mahakavi Ulloor Award for the Poetry collection ‘Kaanaamara’
- Chemmanam Chacko Award
- Akshaya Literary Award
- Malayali Margazhi Sahitya Puraskaram
- Chandrotsavam Puraskaram
- Pazhassi Raja Sahityapratibha Puraskaram, 2019
- The research paper, "A framework for equitable apportionment of emission reduction commitments to mitigate global warming" published in the International Journal of Energy Sector Management was the Highly Commended Award Winner of the Literati Network Awards for Excellence 2012.
- Appreciation award for Anti-tobacco activities in Kerala State by the Regional Cancer Association, 2001.
- Hindi Translation of 'Ramanuthapam' by Dr H Balasubrahmanyam won the translation award of the Ministry of Culture, Govt of India.

== Research Papers ==
Sources:

- Vazhayil, J.P., Balasubramanian., R, 2010. Copenhagen commitments and implications: A comparative analysis of India and China. Energy Policy 38, 7442-7450. https://www.researchgate.net/profile/Joy-P-Vazhayil
- Vazhayil, J.P., Balasubramanian, R., 2013. A Log frame Analysis of India's Climate Change Mitigation Policies and Technology Implications. In Sundaresan, J.; Sreckesh, S.; Ramanathan, A.L.; Sonnenschen, Lenand; Boojh, Ram, Climate Change and Environment, Scientific Publishers, Jodhpur, India. https://iisertvm.academia.edu/JoyVazhayil
- Vazhayil, J.P., Sharma, V.K., Balasubramanian, R., 2011. A framework for equitable apportionment of emission reduction commitments to mitigate global warming. International Journal of Energy Sector Management 5, 381-406
- Vazhayil, J.P. Balasubramanian, R. 2012. Hierarchical Multi-Objective Optimization of India's Energy Strategy Portfolio for Sustainable Development, International Journal of Energy Sector Management, Vol. 6 Iss: 3, pp. 301–20
- Vazhayil, J.P., Balasubramanian, R., 2013. Optimization of India's Power Sector Strategies Using Weight Restricted Stochastic Data Envelopment Analysis, Energy Policy, Vol 56, pp. 456–465.
- Vazhayil, J.P., Balasubramanian, R., February 2014. Optimization of India's Electricity Generation Portfolio Using Intelligent Pareto-Search Genetic Algorithm, International Journal of Electrical Power & Energy Systems 55, 13–20.
- Narasimhan, Ravichandran, Vazhayil, J.P., Narayanaswami, Sundaravalli, 2018,.Employees' provident fund organization: Empowering members by digital transformation, DOI: 10.1002/pa.1844 Journal of Public Affairs.
- Vazhayil, J. (2025). A Conceptual Framework for Synergising Quantum Mechanics and General Relativity (v1.0). Zenodo. https://doi.org/10.5281/zenodo.17507206
