= A. Jayathilak =

Indian civil servant

Chief Secretary of Kerala
- In office 1 May 2025 – 30 June 2026
- Governor: Rajendra Arlekar
- Chief Minister: Pinarayi Vijayan; V. D. Satheesan
- Preceded by: Sarada Muraleedharan
- Succeeded by: Bishwanath Sinha

Personal details
- Born: June 16, 1966 (age 60)
- Occupation: Civil servant

A. Jayathilak (born 16 June 1966) is a retired Indian civil servant and a 1991-batch officer of the Indian Administrative Service (Kerala cadre). He has served as the Chief Secretary of the Government of Kerala from May 2025, as the state's 50th chief secretary till June 2026.

== Early life and education ==
Jayathilak studied medicine at Thiruvananthapuram Medical College and graduated in 1990.

== Career ==
Jayathilak joined the Indian Administrative Service in 1991. He began his field postings as Sub-Collector of Mananthavady and later served as District Collector of Kollam and Kozhikode.

He served as managing director of the Kerala Tourism Development Corporation and was associated with Kerala's tourism branding efforts during the period when officials such as Amitabh Kant and V. Venu were also involved in the state's tourism promotion. He later served on deputation in Chhattisgarh, where he was the first managing director of the Chhattisgarh tourism board.

=== Central government and statutory bodies ===
Jayathilak has served as chairman of the Marine Products Export Development Authority (MPEDA).

He was also the chairman of the Spices Board and as chair of the International Pepper Community during India's chair year.

== Chief Secretary of Kerala ==
On 23 April 2025 the Kerala cabinet approved Jayathilak's appointment as chief secretary, following the impending retirement of incumbent Sarada Muraleedharan on 30 April 2025. He assumed office on 1 May 2025. Jayathilak also serves ex officio as the chief executive officer of the Kerala State Disaster Management Authority (KSDMA).

== Controversies ==
In 2025, shortly before taking charge as Chief Secretary of Kerala, A. Jayathilak was named in a complaint alleging irregularities in the utilisation of Central funds under the Pradhan Mantri Anusuchit Jaati Abhyuday Yojana (PM-AJAY). The complaint was received by the Central Vigilance Commission and forwarded to the Government of Kerala.
