= Vishwas Mehta =

Chief Secretary, Government of Kerala
- In office June 2020 – February 2021
- Governor: Arif Mohammed Khan
- Chief Minister: Pinarayi Vijayan
- Preceded by: Tom Jose IAS
- Succeeded by: Dr. V. P. Joy IAS

Personal details
- Born: 19 February 1961 (age 64) Dungarpur, Rajasthan

Vishwas Mehta (born 19 February 1961) is a senior Indian Administrative Service (IAS) officer from Kerala who retired as the Chief Secretary, Government of Kerala. A native of Rajasthan, he also served as the Chief Information Commissioner of Kerala for a period of three years.

== Career ==
Mehta belongs to 1986 batch of IAS. He began his civil service career as assistant collector of Kollam and Wayanad. Mehta took over as Deputy Secretary in the Revenue Department in 1991 and in 1992 he became Managing Director of the Kerala State Cooperative Rubber Marketing Federation. He had also served as District Collector of Idukki and Wayanad and as Managing Director of Milma. He also served as Principal Secretary in Revenue and Health Department, Additional Chief Secretary in Revenue, Economic Affairs and Housing. Before appointed as Chief Secretary of Kerala, he was Home Secretary. He served as the Chief Secretary, Government of Kerala during the period June 2020 to February 2021. After retirement, he was appointed as the Chief Information Commissioner of Kerala.
