= V. Venu =

Indian civil servant

Chief Secretary of Kerala
- In office 1 July 2023 – 31 August 2024
- Preceded by: V. P. Joy
- Succeeded by: Sarada Muraleedharan

Personal details
- Born: August 20, 1964 (age 62)
- Spouse: Sarada Muraleedharan
- Children: 2
- Education: Government Medical College, Kozhikode
- Profession: Civil servant

V. Venu (also known as Venu Vasudevan; born 20 August 1964) is an Indian retired civil servant and former chief secretary of Kerala. He served as the 48th chief secretary of the Government of Kerala from 1 July 2023 to 31 August 2024. He is a 1990-batch officer of the Indian Administrative Service from the Kerala cadre.

During his career, Venu held senior roles in the Government of Kerala, including additional chief secretary (home and vigilance) and assignments in tourism, culture and disaster recovery, including work associated with the state's Rebuild Kerala Initiative (RKI).

== Early life and education ==
Venu grew up in Kozhikode, Kerala, and studied there before completing an MBBS from Government Medical College, Kozhikode. He participated in theatre activities during his student years.

== Career ==
Venu entered the Indian Administrative Service in 1990 and was allotted the Kerala cadre. Early in his career, he served as Assistant Collector in Thrissur.

=== Tourism and culture ===
Venu later served in senior roles related to Kerala's tourism and cultural administration. He also worked as the director and secretary in the tourism department and as secretary of the culture department, during which the International Theatre Festival of Kerala was launched.

=== Home and vigilance ===
In 2022, Venu was appointed Home Secretary (Home and Vigilance), with additional charge of the Environment Department.

=== Rebuild Kerala Initiative ===
Following the 2018 Kerala floods, Venu was the CEO of Rebuild Kerala Initiative (RKI), associated with the state's reconstruction and resilience planning after the floods.

== Chief Secretary of Kerala ==
On 27 June 2023, the Kerala Cabinet decided to appoint Venu, then additional chief secretary (home), as the next chief secretary of Kerala. He assumed office on 1 July 2023, succeeding V. P. Joy, and served until 31 August 2024.

Venu retired on 31 August 2024 and was succeeded by his spouse, Sarada Muraleedharan, with media coverage noting the unusual handover from husband to wife for the state's top bureaucratic post.

== Post-retirement ==
In September 2024, Venu was appointed chairperson of the board of trustees of the Kochi Biennale Foundation (KBF).

In May 2025, he assumed the role of director and curator of the Mathrubhumi International Festival of Letters (MBIFL) 2026.

== Personal life ==
Venu is married to Sarada Muraleedharan, also a 1990-batch IAS officer, who succeeded him as Chief Secretary of Kerala in 2024. The couple have two children.
