= Tom Jose =

Indian civil servant (born 1960)

Chief Secretary, Government of Kerala
- In office July 2018 – May 2020
- Governor: Arif Mohammed Khan; P. Sathasivam
- Chief Minister: Pinarayi Vijayan
- Preceded by: Paul Antony IAS
- Succeeded by: Dr. Vishwas Mehta IAS

Personal details
- Born: 30 May 1960 (age 66) Pala, Kerala
- Occupation: Bureaucrat

Tom Jose (born 30 May 1960) is an Indian civil servant retired as the Chief Secretary, Government of Kerala. He is an Indian Administrative Service (IAS) officer belonging 1984 batch of Kerala cadre. He served as Chairman of Kerala Shipping and Inland Navigation Corporation (KSINC).

== Education ==
He is a graduate of MBA from Cochin University of Science and Technology.

== Career ==
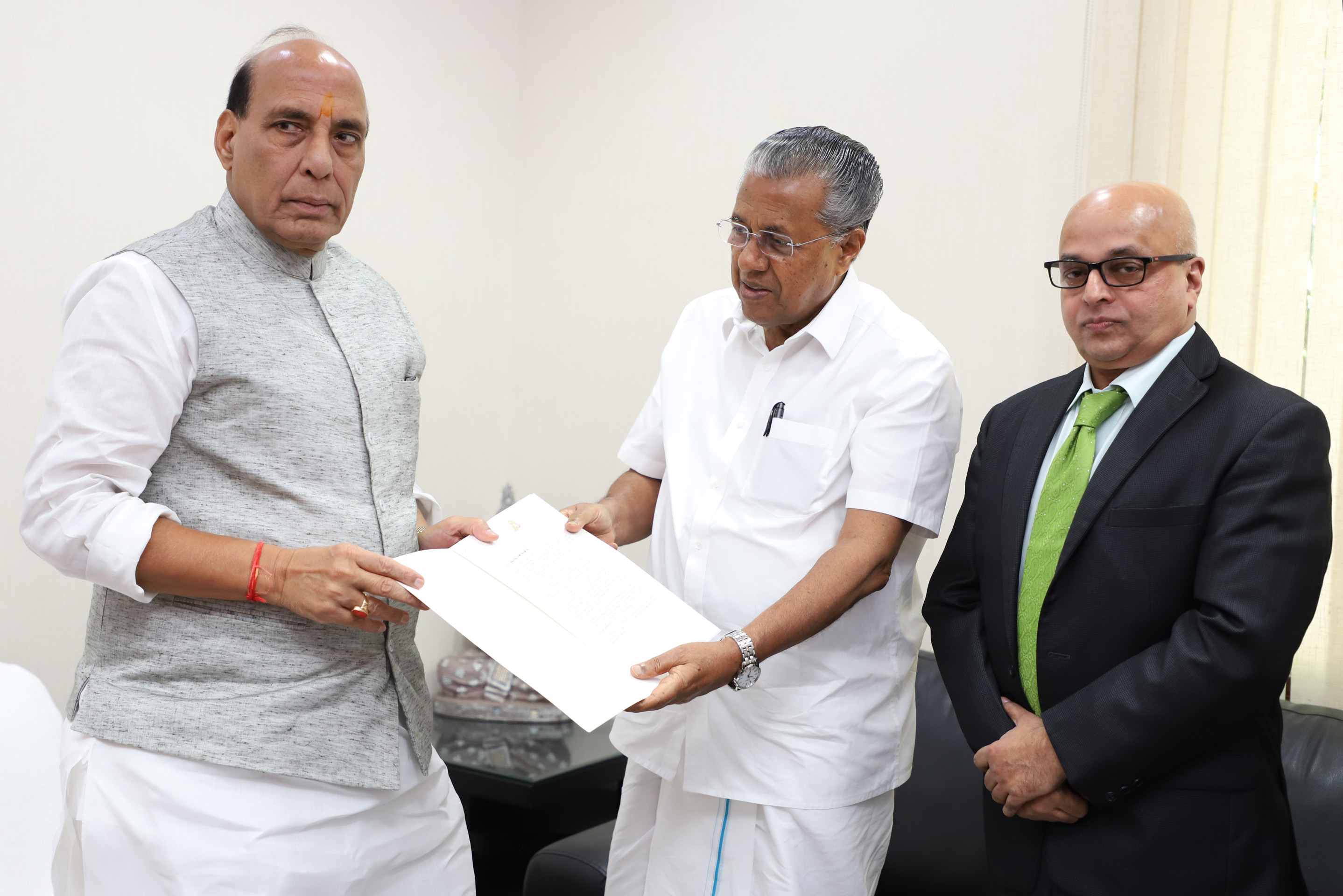
Tom Jose, with Union Home Minister, Rajnath Singh and Chief Minister, Pinarayi Vijayan

Jose started his career as Sub Collector, Thrissur. He was the district collector of Pathanamthitta district. He served in Ministry of Defence as Director and As Counselor in Embassy of India in Moscow from 2004 to 2007. He then served as Principal Secretary in Public Works Department, Higher Education department, Transport department and Planning and Economic affairs department. When Kochi Metro Rail Limited was formed, he served as the first Managing Director. Also he held the position of Managing Director of KSIDC and KSINC. Before appointed as Chief Secretary, he was Additional Chief Secretary, Labour & Skills Department. His tenure as Chief Secretary of Kerala was challenging, with Nipah Outbreak, 2018 Floods and COVID-19 outbreak. He was able to efficiently manage the emergencies in professional manner. After retirement, he served as Chairman, Kerala Shipping and Inland Navigation Corporation.
