= Gold Cup (India) =

International women's association football tournament

- Organiser(s): AIFF
- Founded: 2019; 7 years ago
- Region: India
- Teams: 4
- Current champions: Myanmar (1st title)
- Most championships: Myanmar (1 title)

The Gold Cup is a 4-team women's football tournament organised by the All India Football Federation (AIFF). It was launched in 2019 with the first edition being held at the Kalinga Stadium in association with the Government of Odisha. The tournament naming rights were purchased by Hero MotoCorp which also sponsors the national team.

The first edition was held in 2019, which was won by Myanmar.

== Results ==
| Year | Host | Winner | Runner-up | 3rd Place | 4th Place |
|---|---|---|---|---|---|
| 2019; Details | Bhubaneswar | Myanmar | Nepal | India | Iran |

== Medal summary ==
| Rank | Nation | Gold | Silver | Bronze | Total |
|---|---|---|---|---|---|
| 1 | Myanmar | 1 | 0 | 0 | 1 |
| 2 | Nepal | 0 | 1 | 0 | 1 |
| 3 | India | 0 | 0 | 1 | 1 |
| Totals (3 entries) | | 1 | 1 | 1 | 3 |
