= Galaxy Racer =

Emirati eSports organization

- Games: Battlegrounds Mobile India; Counter-Strike: Global Offensive; Dota 2; Fortnite; Free Fire; League of Legends; League of Legends: Wild Rift; Mobile Legends: Bang Bang; PUBG Mobile
- Founded: 2019
- Location: Dubai, United Arab Emirates
- Colors
- CEO: Paul Roy
- Website: galaxyracer.gg

Galaxy Racer is an esports and gaming organization based in Dubai, UAE, and founded in 2019 by Paul Roy. As of 2023, Galaxy Racer's competitive esports division, Nigma Galaxy, has a roster of 13 esports teams playing Battlegrounds Mobile India, Counter-Strike: Global Offensive, Dota 2, Fortnite, Free Fire, League of Legends, League of Legends: Wild Rift, Mobile Legends: Bang Bang and PUBG Mobile. It also has partnerships with various companies and organizations such as La Liga and Polaris Sports.

== History ==
In 2019, Galaxy Racer Esports together with its partners formed the first female esports team in the Middle East. The team consisted of five members: Madha Naz, Arwa Hameed, Reem Faisal, Fatima Said and Amna Raad Alameri.

On 12–13 December 2019, Galaxy Racer and Meydan One organized the first interschool esports tournament in the Middle East featuring FIFA 20. The tournament was part of the 2019 GIRLGAMER Esports Festival. On 19–22 February 2020, Galaxy Racer organized the final of the GIRLGAMER Esports Festival, where gamers competed in Counter Strike: Global Offensive and League of Legends. The event was held at the Meydan Grandstand in Dubai.

In 2021, Team Galaxy Racer won the Free Fire India Championship (FFIC). Team Galaxy Racer captained by VasiyoCRJ, Golden, BarcaBoi, Aman and MaryX scored 70 points ahead of Team Chaos (68 points) and Team Elite (67 points), who came in as first and second runners-up, respectively. Galaxy Racer received a prize pool of Rs 35,000,000. In addition to the prize money, the Galaxy Racer team got the opportunity to qualify for the Free Fire World Series tournament in Singapore.

From 18 April to 21 April 2021 Galaxy Racer organized Fortnite tournament in Australia. In July 2021, Allan Fang was appointed as the organization's new chief marketing officer (CMO).

In the same month, Galaxy Racer won the Valorant Champions Tour (VCT) Challengers 2 Stage 3 for the Philippines. Galaxy Racer were directly selected for the VCT Challengers tournament for the Philippines after losing to Bren Esports in the Challengers 1 Grand Finals in early July 2021. Galaxy Racer won against Sierra Esports Atlas and Alpha Esports Pro to advance to the VCT Challengers Grand Finals. In the grand final with a score of 3:1, they defeated the SV Empire team, which in turn defeated UCFC Esports and Oasis Gaming. Galaxy Racer received a prize of 100,000 pesos and a spot in the 2021 VCT Stage 3 Challengers Playoffs for South East Asia.

From 1 to 4 August 2021, Galaxy Racer partnered with football player Pierre-Emerick Aubameyang and his brother William-Fils to host an interregional Fortnite: Battle Royale tournament for Europe and the Middle East called The Aubameyang Cup.

At the beginning of August 2021, the PUBG Mobile and Battlegrounds Mobile India roster for Galaxy Racer was changed. The team for PUBG Mobile included Raouf Abdellah, Maad Ali Akshar, Reshar Dawid, Muslim Ahmed Jawad and Mohammed Qasim, while the Battlegrounds Mobile India team consisted of Mohammed Owais Lakhani, Aakash Anandani, Hemanth Sethi, Harshit Mahajan and Yogesh Yadav.

On 15 August 2021, the Galaxy Racer team from Southeast Asia became the BTS Pro Series: SEA Season 7 champion by defeating Fnatic in the grand final. Galaxy Racer received a $18,000 prize plus an additional $2,000 for their group stage victories.

=== Team Nigma ===
Team Nigma was founded in 2019 by former Team Liquid Dota 2 players, including Kuro Salehi Takhasomi, Amer Al-Barkawi, Maroun Merhej and Ivan Ivanov, along with esports executives Mohamed Morad and Christoph Timm. The organization was initially established around its Dota 2 team, which included players from the roster that won The International 2017.

=== Nigma Galaxy ===
In September 2021, Team Nigma and Galaxy Racer merged under the name Nigma Galaxy. After the merger, the organization expanded into additional esports titles, including Counter-Strike, League of Legends and mobile esports games.

Galaxy Racer along with eLaLiga Santander organized the Beat the Best international tournaments series for FIFA 22 and FIFA Online 4 players from December 2021 to May 2022. From 2 to 6 March 2022, Galaxy Racer hosted the GAMERS GALAXY: Dota 2 Invitational Series in Dubai. In the first round, the Nigma Galaxy team played against Tundra Esports and, in the final gaming result, the Boom Esports team won the tournament

In the spring of 2022, Galaxy Racer established HER Galaxy, a platform for female-identifying gamers, headquartered in Los Angeles. In the summer of 2022, Galaxy Racer launched Pakistan's first esports league, the Supreme Galactic League, which took place from August to October 2022.

As of 2023, the esports organization has its representatives in the UAE, Indonesia, India, Malaysia, Pakistan, the Philippines, Thailand, United States and other locations.

The team won Women’s Counter-Strike Team of the Year at the HLTV Awards 2023 and the ESL Impact League Season 4 Finals in 2023. It also finished 5th–6th at The International 2025.

In November 2024, Nigma Galaxy participated in the 1win Series Dota 2 Fall, facing seven other teams including Team Liquid and OG. The event offered a US$100,000 prize pool and marked Nigma Galaxy's return after a group-stage exit in the summer edition.

On June 14, 2025, Nigma Galaxy played NAVI Junior in a best-of-three during the Western Europe Closed Qualifier for The International 2025. The team entered via direct invite, while NAVI Junior had beaten Yellow Submarine. On June 18, Nigma Galaxy qualified for The International 2025 by defeating OG 2–1 in the Western European qualifier's lower bracket final. The roster included Kuro "KuroKy" Salehi Takhasomi, Maroun "GH] Merhej, and Syed "SumaiL" Hassan, returning six years after their second-place finish at The International 2019. In Dota 2 they finished 5th–6th.

In August 2025, Nigma Galaxy finished the Clavision Masters 2025: Snow-Ruyi group stage 4–0, topping Group A over teams such as Tundra Esports, PARIVISION, Xtreme Gaming, and BOOM Esports, securing a spot in the Upper Bracket Semifinals.

== Esports divisions ==
The organization has also fielded a women's Counter-Strike team that has competed in the ESL Impact League. In mobile esports, Nigma Galaxy has fielded teams in Battlegrounds Mobile India, including a roster assembled through the acquisition of players from Celcius Esports.

== Rosters ==
=== BGMI ===
{{{team}}} BGMI roster
Players	Coaches
Handle / Name / Nationality; ATF / Halim, Muhammad / Malaysia	Head coach Muhammad Halim
Legend: (I) Inactive; (S) Suspended; Substitute; (injured) Injury / Illness	Roster updated 11 February 2023.

=== CS:GO ===
{{{team}}} CS:GO (Note: Female team) roster
Players
Coaches

Handle	Name	Nationality
Kat	Vašková, Katarína	Slovakia
Tory	Kazieva, Viktoria	Russia
JTR	Júnior, Ricardo	Portugal
ANa	Dumbravă, Ana	Romania
Vilga	Klyuenkova, Ksenia	Russia
Twenty3	Timonina, Alexandra	Russia

Head coach

Ricardo Júnior

Legend:
- (I) Inactive
- (S) Suspended
- Substitute
- (injured) Injury / Illness

Roster updated 11 February 2023.

=== Dota 2 ===
{{{team}}} Dota 2 roster
Players
Coaches

Handle	Name	Nationality
Yuma	Langlet, Yuma	Argentina
Mikey	Mesbah, Kasra	Iran
MinD_ContRoL	Ivanov, Ivan	Bulgaria
GH	Merhej, Maroun	Lebanon
KuroKy	Takhasomi, Kuro	Germany

Head coach

Park Tae-won

Legend:
- (I) Inactive
- (S) Suspended
- Substitute
- (injured) Injury / Illness

Roster updated 26 October 2023.

=== Fortnite ===
{{{team}}} Fortnite roster
Players
Coaches

Handle	Name	Nationality
Queasy	Cvetkovic, Aleksa	Serbia
Teeq	Radzio, Maciej	Poland
Souriano	-, -	United Arab Emirates
Malibuca	Yakovenko, Danila	Russia

Head coach

- Vacant

Legend:
- (I) Inactive
- (S) Suspended
- Substitute
- (injured) Injury / Illness

Roster updated 11 February 2023.

=== Free Fire ===
==== India team ====
{{{team}}} Free Fire roster
Players	Coaches
Handle / Name / Nationality; Golden / Chavan, Atharva / India	Head coach: Vacant
Legend: (I) Inactive; (S) Suspended; Substitute; (injured) Injury / Illness	Roster updated 11 February 2023.

==== Thailand team ====
{{{team}}} Free Fire roster
Players
Coaches

Handle	Name	Nationality
DAREN	Kongkamnerd, Sittinon	Thailand
XPENSION	Wongsoongnoen, Kasama	Thailand
STOP	Chalongkun, Thinnabat	Thailand
FIWGOD	Chaitip, Titipong	Thailand
CARAMEL	Khunachon, Sitthichai	Thailand
DEW	Rompochai, Rattapong	Thailand

Head coach

- Vacant

Legend:
- (I) Inactive
- (S) Suspended
- Substitute
- (injured) Injury / Illness

Roster updated 11 February 2023.

=== League of Legends ===
{{{team}}} LoL roster
Players
Coaches

Handle	Name	Nationality
Kerberos	Ram, Kallon	United Kingdom
Cipher	-, -	Lebanon
Pabu	Pavone, Jackson	Australia
Ceres	Mascarenhas, Evan	Australia

Head coach

- Vacant

Legend:
- (I) Inactive
- (S) Suspended
- Substitute
- (injured) Injury / Illness

Roster updated 11 February 2023.

=== League of Legends: Wild Rift ===
{{{team}}} LoLWR roster
Players
Coaches

Handle	Name	Nationality
Hide	Baguino, Sean	Philippines
Aaron	Bingay, Aaron	Philippines
Power	Barbadillo, Jon	Philippines
Juschie	Tan, Justine	Philippines
DemonKite	Dajao, Golden	Philippines

Head coach

- Vacant

Legend:
- (I) Inactive
- (S) Suspended
- Substitute
- (injured) Injury / Illness

Roster updated 11 February 2023.

=== Mobile Legends: Bang Bang ===
{{{team}}} ML:BB roster
Players	Coaches
Handle / Name / Nationality; Mozia / -, - / Indonesia	Head coach: Vacant
Legend: (I) Inactive; (S) Suspended; Substitute; (injured) Injury / Illness	Roster updated 11 February 2023.

=== PUBG Mobile ===
{{{team}}} PUBG Mobile roster
Players
Coaches

Handle	Name	Nationality
Savior	Halim, Muhammad	Malaysia
MaxKasH	Anandani, Akash	India

Head coach

Muhammad Halim

Legend:
- (I) Inactive
- (S) Suspended
- Substitute
- (injured) Injury / Illness

Roster updated 11 February 2023.

=== Valorant ===
{{{team}}} Valorant roster
Players
Coaches

Handle	Name	Nationality
Pizzafps	Ardiente, Jehiel	Philippines
Tr1cks	In Lee, Kyung	Philippines

Head coach

- Vacant

Legend:
- (I) Inactive
- (S) Suspended
- Substitute
- (injured) Injury / Illness

Roster updated 11 February 2023.

== Partnerships and collaborations ==
Nigma Galaxy has entered into commercial partnerships with companies including Etihad Airways, Aldar Properties and BMW Group Middle East. In partnership with Aldar Properties, the organization launched the Nigma Galaxy Experience facility at Yas Mall in Abu Dhabi.

In 2023, Galaxy Racer announced its partnership with Polaris Sports, an organization dedicated to protecting the commercial rights of athletes. As part of the partnership, Polaris Sports becomes an investor and shareholder in Galaxy Racer. In December 2022, Galaxy Racer signed a 15-year partnership with Spanish La Liga to work on the sports media scene.

In May 2022, Galaxy Racer partnered with the Collegiate Center for Esports (CCE) to create first esports tournament in the Philippines. In August 2022, they partnered with Empire Records to form the music label GXR Records.

In January 2021, Galaxy Racer announced its partnership with eLaliga. In February 2021, Galaxy Racer acquired a majority stake in Philippine esports and gaming agency DreamFyre. In May 2021, they have entered a partnership with gaming company Techxhub for its PUBG Mobile players.

== See also ==
- FaZe Clan
- 100 Thieves
