= 2018 SAFF Championship squads =

This article lists the confirmed national football squads for the 2018 SAFF Championship tournament held in Bangladesh, between 4 September and 15 September 2018. The position listed for each player is per the squad list in the official match reports by the SAFF. The age listed for each player is on 4 September 2018, the first day of the tournament. Players may hold more than one non-FIFA nationality. A flag is included for coaches that are of a different nationality than their own national team.

== Group A ==
=== Bangladesh ===
Bangladesh announced their squad on 3 September 2018.

Coach: (England) Jamie Day

No.	Pos.	Player	Date of birth (age)	Caps	Goals	Club
1	GK	Ashraful Islam Rana	1 May 1988 (aged 30)	9	0	(Bangladesh Football Federation) Saif Sporting
22	GK	Shahidul Alam Sohel	1 May 1992 (aged 26)	19	0	(Bangladesh Football Federation) Dhaka Abahani
25	GK	Anisur Rahman Zico	10 August 1997 (aged 21)	0	0	(Bangladesh Football Federation) Saif Sporting
2	DF	Nasiruddin Chowdhury	9 October 1979 (aged 38)	23	1	(Bangladesh Football Federation) Dhaka Abahani
3	DF	Wali Faisal	1 March 1985 (aged 33)	38	0	(Bangladesh Football Federation) Dhaka Abahani
4	DF	Topu Barman	20 December 1994 (aged 23)	21	1	(Bangladesh Football Federation) Saif Sporting
5	DF	Tutul Hossain Badsha	12 August 1998 (aged 20)	2	0	(Bangladesh Football Federation) Dhaka Abahani
12	DF	Bishwanath Ghosh	30 May 1999 (aged 19)	0	0	(Bangladesh Football Federation) Sheikh Russel
21	DF	Sushanto Tripura	5 October 1998 (aged 19)	0	0	(Bangladesh Football Federation) Saif Sporting
6	MF	Jamal Bhuyan (captain)	10 April 1990 (aged 28)	28	0	(Bangladesh Football Federation) Saif Sporting
7	MF	Emon Mahmud Babu	3 June 1991 (aged 27)	9	0	(Bangladesh Football Federation) Bashundhara Kings
8	MF	Mamunul Islam	12 December 1988 (aged 29)	51	3	(Bangladesh Football Federation) Chittagong Abahani
13	MF	Atiqur Rahman Fahad	15 September 1995 (aged 22)	2	0	(Bangladesh Football Federation) Dhaka Abahani
15	MF	Biplu Ahmed	5 May 1999 (aged 19)	1	0	(Bangladesh Football Federation) Dhaka Mohammedan
17	MF	Sohel Rana	27 March 1995 (aged 23)	25	0	(Bangladesh Football Federation) Dhaka Abahani
18	MF	Masuk Mia Jony	16 January 1998 (aged 20)	4	0	(Bangladesh Football Federation) Saif Sporting
19	MF	Faisal Mahmud	16 January 1983 (aged 35)	8	0	(Bangladesh Football Federation) Dhaka Mohammedan
9	FW	Saad Uddin	1 September 1998 (aged 20)	0	0	(Bangladesh Football Federation) Dhaka Abahani
10	FW	Shakhawat Hossain Rony	8 October 1991 (aged 26)	17	7	(Bangladesh Football Federation) Chittagong Abahani
16	FW	Mahbubur Rahman Sufil	10 September 1999 (aged 18)	1	1	(Bangladesh Football Federation) Arambagh KS

=== Bhutan ===
Coach: (England) Trevor Morgan

No.	Pos.	Player	Date of birth (age)	Caps	Goals	Club
1	GK	Ngawang Jamphel	27 September 1992 (aged 25)	1	0	(Bhutan Football Federation) Thimphu City
19	GK	Kinzang Gyeltshen	16 April 1993 (aged 25)	1	0	(Bhutan Football Federation) Thimphu FC
21	GK	Tshering Dendup	4 April 1994 (aged 24)	4	0	(Bhutan Football Federation) Paro United
2	DF	Tshering Samdup	5 February 1998 (aged 20)	0	0	(Bhutan Football Federation) Transport United
3	DF	Choki Wangchuk	2 February 1998 (aged 20)	5	0	(Bhutan Football Federation) Transport United
4	DF	Mipham Jigme	20 November 1998 (aged 19)	0	0	(Bhutan Football Federation) Thimphu City
9	DF	Tenzin Dorji	18 August 1997 (aged 21)	6	0	(Bhutan Football Federation) Transport United
12	DF	Phuntsho Jigme	11 September 1997 (aged 20)	0	0	(Bhutan Football Federation) Thimphu FC
22	DF	Rinchen Dorji	24 April 1994 (aged 24)	0	0	(Bhutan Football Federation) Transport United
6	MF	Galey Zangpo	2 April 1994 (aged 24)	0	0	(Bhutan Football Federation) Druk Star
8	MF	Karma Shedrup Tshering (captain)	9 April 1990 (aged 28)	28	1	(Bhutan Football Federation) Thimphu City
13	MF	Kencho Tobgay	11 October 1991 (aged 26)	3	0	(Bhutan Football Federation) Transport United
15	MF	Nima Wangdi	6 December 1998 (aged 19)	10	0	(Bhutan Football Federation) Thimphu City
16	MF	Tshering Dorji	11 September 1995 (aged 22)	25	4	(Bhutan Football Federation) Thimphu City
18	MF	Chimi Dorji	22 December 1993 (aged 24)	12	0	(Bhutan Football Federation) Thimphu City
7	FW	Chencho Gyeltshen	10 May 1996 (aged 22)	30	10	(All India Football Federation) Bengaluru FC
10	FW	Kabi Raj Rai	17 March 1997 (aged 21)	0	0	(Bhutan Football Federation) Paro United
17	FW	Tsenda Dorji	12 February 1995 (aged 23)	0	0	(Bhutan Football Federation) Thimphu FC
20	FW	Phurba Wangchuk	18 February 1996 (aged 22)	0	0	(Bhutan Football Federation) Tensung
23	FW	Kuenga Rabgay	1 January 1998 (aged 20)	0	0	(Bhutan Football Federation) Druk Star

=== Nepal ===
Nepal announced their squad on 27 August 2018.

Coach: Bal Gopal Maharjan

No.	Pos.	Player	Date of birth (age)	Caps	Goals	Club
1	GK	Bikesh Kuthu	24 June 1993 (aged 25)	5	0	(All Nepal Football Association) Nepal Army
16	GK	Kiran Chemjong	20 March 1990 (aged 28)	52	0	(Football Association of Maldives) T.C. Sports Club
19	GK	Alan Neupane	24 June 1996 (aged 22)			(All Nepal Football Association) Three Star
3	DF	Biraj Maharjan (captain)	18 September 1990 (aged 27)	68	1	(All Nepal Football Association) Manang Marshyangdi
4	DF	Ananta Tamang	14 January 1998 (aged 20)	16	1	(All Nepal Football Association) Three Star
5	DF	Devendra Tamang	1 November 1993 (aged 24)	3	0	(All Nepal Football Association) Chyasal Youth Club
6	DF	Aditya Chaudhary	19 April 1996 (aged 22)	17	0	(All Nepal Football Association) Armed Police Force
22	DF	Dinesh Rajbanshi	4 April 1998 (aged 20)	1	0	(All Nepal Football Association) Nepal Police
23	DF	Rohit Chand	1 March 1992 (aged 26)	49	0	(Football Association of Indonesia) Persija Jakarta
25	DF	Suman Aryal	9 March 1996 (aged 22)			(All Nepal Football Association) Nepal Police
7	MF	Nirajan Khadka	6 October 1988 (aged 29)	28	0	(All Nepal Football Association) Three Star
8	MF	Bishal Rai	22 September 1994 (aged 23)	14	3	(All Nepal Football Association) Manang Marshyangdi
9	MF	Sunil Bal	1 January 1998 (aged 20)			(All Nepal Football Association) Three Star
11	MF	Heman Gurung	27 February 1996 (aged 22)	12	0	(All Nepal Football Association) Manang Marshyangdi
15	MF	Sujal Shrestha	4 February 1993 (aged 25)	18	2	(All Nepal Football Association) Manang Marshyangdi
30	MF	Hemant Thapa Magar	7 January 1998 (aged 20)	1	0	(All Nepal Football Association) Chyasal Youth Club
10	FW	Bimal Gharti Magar	26 January 1998 (aged 20)	26	6	(All Nepal Football Association) Three Star
14	FW	Anjan Bista	15 May 1998 (aged 20)	22	0	(All Nepal Football Association) Manang Marshyangdi
18	FW	Nawayug Shrestha	8 June 1990 (aged 28)	18	5	(Bhutan Football Federation) Paro FC
21	FW	Bharat Khawas	22 July 1991 (aged 27)	46	9	(All Nepal Football Association) Nepal Army

=== Pakistan ===
Pakistan announced their squad on 1 September 2018.

Coach: (Brazil) José Antonio Nogueira

No.	Pos.	Player	Date of birth (age)	Caps	Goals	Club
1	GK	Yousuf Butt	18 October 1989 (aged 28)	12	0	(Danish Football Association) Greve Fodbold
18	GK	Ahsanullah Ahmed	23 February 1995 (aged 23)	0	0	(Pakistan Football Federation) SSGC
22	GK	Saqib Hanif	28 April 1994 (aged 24)	2	0	(Football Association of Maldives) BA. A. Maalhos
2	DF	Muhammad Umar Hayat	22 September 1996 (aged 21)	0	0	(Pakistan Football Federation) WAPDA
3	DF	Mohsin Ali	1 June 1996 (aged 22)	4	0	(Pakistan Football Federation) WAPDA
4	DF	Abdullah Qazi	25 March 1995 (aged 23)	0	0	(United States Soccer Federation) La Máquina
6	DF	Zesh Rehman	14 October 1983 (aged 34)	18	1	(Football Association of Hong Kong, China) Southern
23	DF	Faisal Iqbal	8 April 1992 (aged 26)	18	0	(Pakistan Football Federation) NBP
28	DF	Shahbaz Younas	2 March 1996 (aged 22)	0	0	(Pakistan Football Federation) Army
5	MF	Naveed Ahmed	3 January 1993 (aged 25)	8	0	(Pakistan Football Federation) Navy
7	MF	Bilawal Ur-Rehman	4 October 1993 (aged 24)	4	0	(Pakistan Football Federation) SSGC
8	MF	Mehmood Khan	10 June 1991 (aged 27)	4	0	(Pakistan Football Federation) SSGC
12	MF	Saadullah Khan	4 June 1994 (aged 24)	3	1	(Pakistan Football Federation) SSGC
17	MF	Saddam Hussain (Captain)	10 April 1993 (aged 25)	19	0	(Pakistan Football Federation) SSGC
21	MF	Muhammad Adil	9 July 1992 (aged 26)	19	0	(Pakistan Football Federation) KRL
27	MF	Ahmed Faheem	4 December 1994 (aged 23)	0	0	(Pakistan Football Federation) WAPDA
9	FW	Muhammad Ali	2 September 1989 (aged 29)	8	0	(Danish Football Association) Greve Fodbold
10	FW	Hassan Bashir (Vice-captain)	7 January 1987 (aged 31)	15	4	(Danish Football Association) Greve Fodbold
14	FW	Adnan Mohammad	2 July 1996 (aged 22)	0	0	(Danish Football Association) Lyngby
16	FW	Muhammad Riaz	27 February 1996 (aged 22)	1	0	(Pakistan Football Federation) K-Electric

== Group B ==
=== India ===
India announced their squad on 4 September 2018.

Coach: (England) Stephen Constantine

No.	Pos.	Player	Date of birth (age)	Caps	Goals	Club
1	GK	Vishal Kaith	5 July 1996 (aged 22)	0	0	(All India Football Federation) Pune City
16	GK	Kamaljit Singh	28 December 1995 (aged 22)	0	0	(All India Football Federation) Pune City
30	GK	Sukhdev Patil	23 November 1998 (aged 19)	0	0	(All India Football Federation) Delhi Dynamos
2	DF	Salam Ranjan Singh	4 December 1995 (aged 22)	4	0	(All India Football Federation) East Bengal
3	DF	Subhasish Bose (captain)	18 August 1995 (aged 23)	4	0	(All India Football Federation) Mumbai City
5	DF	Davinder Singh	23 September 1995 (aged 22)	0	0	(All India Football Federation) Mumbai City
6	DF	Jerry Lalrinzuala	30 July 1998 (aged 20)	5	0	(All India Football Federation) Chennaiyin
12	DF	Sarthak Golui	3 November 1997 (aged 20)	0	0	(All India Football Federation) Mohun Bagan
29	DF	Mohammad Sajid Dhot	10 December 1997 (aged 20)	0	0	(All India Football Federation) Delhi Dynamos
7	MF	Anirudh Thapa	15 January 1998 (aged 20)	7	0	(All India Football Federation) Chennaiyin
8	MF	Germanpreet Singh	24 June 1996 (aged 22)	4	0	(All India Football Federation) Chennaiyin
14	MF	Vinit Rai	10 October 1997 (aged 20)	1	0	(All India Football Federation) Delhi Dynamos
19	MF	Ashique Kuruniyan	14 June 1997 (aged 21)	4	0	(All India Football Federation) Pune City
21	MF	Vignesh Dakshinamurthy	5 March 1998 (aged 20)	0	0	(All India Football Federation) Mumbai City
22	MF	Nikhil Poojari	3 September 1995 (aged 23)	2	0	(All India Football Federation) Pune City
25	MF	Lallianzuala Chhangte	8 June 1997 (aged 21)	4	2	(All India Football Federation) Delhi Dynamos
9	FW	Manvir Singh	6 November 1995 (aged 22)	2	0	(All India Football Federation) FC Goa
10	FW	Sumeet Passi	12 September 1994 (aged 23)	4	2	(All India Football Federation) Jamshedpur FC
11	FW	Hitesh Sharma	25 December 1997 (aged 20)	0	0	(All India Football Federation) ATK
15	FW	Farukh Choudhary	8 November 1996 (aged 21)	0	0	(All India Football Federation) Jamshedpur FC

=== Maldives ===
Maldives announced their squad on 2 September 2018.

Coach: (Croatia) Petar Segrt

No.	Pos.	Player	Date of birth (age)	Caps	Goals	Club
1	GK	Hussain Shareef	5 September 1998 (aged 19)	0	0	(Football Association of Maldives) Maziya
18	GK	Tholaal Hassan	31 March 1990 (aged 28)	0	0	(Football Association of Maldives) United Victory
22	GK	Mohamed Faisal	4 September 1988 (aged 30)	14	0	(Football Association of Maldives) New Radiant
2	DF	Ali Samooh	5 July 1996 (aged 22)	11	0	(Football Association of Maldives) Maziya
3	DF	Ahmed Numaan	10 November 1992 (aged 25)	1	0	(Football Association of Maldives) Club Eagles
4	DF	Hussain Sifaau Yoosuf	4 February 1996 (aged 22)	2	1	(Football Association of Maldives) Club Eagles
13	DF	Akram Abdul Ghanee (captain)	19 March 1987 (aged 31)	57	0	(Football Association of Maldives) New Radiant
19	DF	Mujuthaaz Mohamed	25 October 1992 (aged 25)	2	0	(Football Association of Maldives) Club Eagles
25	DF	Samdhooh Mohamed	29 September 1991 (aged 26)	13	0	(Football Association of Maldives) Club Green Streets
6	MF	Mohamed Arif	11 August 1985 (aged 33)	51	1	(Football Association of Maldives) Club Eagles
7	MF	Ali Fasir	4 September 1988 (aged 30)	47	10	(Football Association of Maldives) New Radiant
10	MF	Hamza Mohamed	17 February 1995 (aged 23)	28	2	(Football Association of Maldives) New Radiant
5	MF	Mohamed Irufaan	24 July 1994 (aged 24)	4	0	(Football Association of Maldives) Maziya
20	MF	Ibrahim Waheed Hassan	15 November 1995 (aged 22)	3	1	(Football Association of Maldives) T.C. Sports Club
23	MF	Hussain Nihan	6 July 1992 (aged 26)	1	0	(Football Association of Maldives) Victory Sports Club
27	MF	Ahmed Imaz	12 April 1992 (aged 26)	17	2	(Football Association of Maldives) Maziya
9	FW	Asadhulla Abdulla	19 October 1990 (aged 27)	30	9	(Football Association of Maldives) Maziya
11	FW	Naiz Hassan	10 May 1996 (aged 22)	17	8	(Football Association of Maldives) Maziya
14	FW	Riham Abdul Ghanee	2 March 1997 (aged 21)	2	0	(Football Association of Maldives) New Radiant
17	FW	Ibrahim Mahudhee	22 August 1993 (aged 25)	3	1	(Football Association of Maldives) T.C. Sports Club

=== Sri Lanka ===
Sri Lanka announced their squad on 24 August 2018.

Coach: Pakir Ali

No.	Pos.	Player	Date of birth (age)	Caps	Goals	Club
1	GK	Sujan Perera	18 July 1982 (aged 36)	19	0	(Football Association of Maldives) Club Eagles
22	GK	Danushka Rajapaksha	17 May 1993 (aged 25)	0	0	(Football Federation of Sri Lanka) New Young's
30	GK	Kavish Fernando	25 May 1995 (aged 23)	0	0	(Football Federation of Sri Lanka) Colombo FC
2	DF	Subash Madushan	31 May 1990 (aged 28)	13	1	(Football Federation of Sri Lanka) Navy SC
3	DF	Bandara Warakagoda	13 October 1986 (aged 31)	20	0	(Football Federation of Sri Lanka) Army SC
4	DF	Yogendran Puslas	4 April 1990 (aged 28)			(Football Federation of Sri Lanka) New Young's
12	DF	Jude Supan	30 July 1998 (aged 20)	1	0	(Football Federation of Sri Lanka) Renown
24	DF	Charitha Mudiyanselage	26 December 1992 (aged 25)	1	0	(Football Federation of Sri Lanka) Colombo FC
28	DF	Harsha Fernando	21 November 1992 (aged 25)	1	0	(Football Federation of Sri Lanka) Air Force SC
7	MF	Mohamed Rifnas	9 January 1995 (aged 23)	13	3	(Football Federation of Sri Lanka) Colombo FC
8	MF	Asikur Rahuman	31 December 1993 (aged 24)	13	1	(Football Federation of Sri Lanka) Army SC
9	MF	Kavindu Ishan	17 October 1992 (aged 25)	19	1	(Football Federation of Sri Lanka) Air Force SC
11	MF	Dilan De Silva	13 September 1988 (aged 29)	1	0	(Football Federation of Sri Lanka) Colombo FC
13	MF	Mariyathas Nitharshan	14 May 1994 (aged 24)	1	0	(Football Federation of Sri Lanka) Renown
17	MF	Sasanga Dilhara	10 June 1999 (aged 19)			(Football Federation of Sri Lanka) Ratnam
19	MF	Afeel Mohamed	9 July 1996 (aged 22)	2	0	(Football Federation of Sri Lanka) Colombo FC
20	MF	Chameera Sajith	29 January 1993 (aged 25)	17	0	(Football Federation of Sri Lanka) Army SC
10	FW	Zohar Mohamed Zarwan	23 April 1996 (aged 22)	14	1	(Football Federation of Sri Lanka) Colombo FC
14	FW	Mohamed Fazal	30 April 1990 (aged 28)	3	1	(Football Federation of Sri Lanka) Colombo FC
21	FW	Asela Madushan	9 December 1999 (aged 18)	1	0	(Football Federation of Sri Lanka) Renown
