= Sri Lanka national football team =

Men's national association football team

Sri Lanka
- Nickname(s): Golden Army රන් හමුදාව தங்கப் படை
- Association: Football Federation of Sri Lanka (FFSL)
- Confederation: AFC (Asia)
- Sub-confederation: SAFF (South Asia)
- Head coach: Abdullah Al Mutairi
- Captain: Sujan Perera
- Most caps: Channa Ediri Bandanage (70)
- Top scorer: Kasun Jayasuriya (28)
- Home stadium: Sugathadasa Stadium; Colombo Racecourse
- FIFA code: SRI
First colours	Second colours

FIFA ranking
- Current: 184 ▲3 (7 October 2026)
- Highest: 122 (August 1998)
- Lowest: 207 (October 2022)

First international
- Ceylon 0–1 India (Colombo, Ceylon; 26 April 1949)

Biggest win
- Sri Lanka 7–1 Pakistan (Taipei, Taiwan; 4 April 2008); Sri Lanka 6–0 Bhutan (Dhaka, Bangladesh; 6 December 2009)

Biggest defeat
- Ceylon 1–12 East Germany (Colombo, Ceylon; 12 January 1964)

SAFF Championship
- Appearances: 14 (first in 1993)
- Best result: Champions (1995)

AFC Challenge Cup
- Appearances: 3 (first in 2006)
- Best result: Runners-up (2006)

The Sri Lanka national football team (Sinhala: ශ්‍රී ලංකා පාපන්දු කණ්ඩායම Shri Lanka Papandu Kandayama, Tamil: இலங்கை தேசிய கால்பந்து அணி Ilaṅkai Tēciya Kālpantu Aṇi) represents Sri Lanka in Association football and is administered by Football Federation of Sri Lanka, the governing body of football in Sri Lanka. They have been a member of FIFA since 1952 and a member of AFC since 1954. Sri Lanka's home stadium is the Sugathadasa Stadium in Colombo. The Sri Lankan team was known as the Ceylon national football team until 1972 when Ceylon was renamed Sri Lanka.

A member of the AFC, the team has yet to make their first appearance in FIFA World Cup or AFC Asian Cup finals. They have been South Asian champions once, in 1995. As is true elsewhere on the sub-continent, top-level football in Sri Lanka stands somewhat in the shadow of the country's Cricket team. However, the side did reach the second qualification stage for the 2006 World Cup. In the same year, they became the runners-up in the 2006 Challenge Cup.

In the qualification round of the 2018 World Cup, Sri Lanka lost both matches against Bhutan and failed to qualify for the next round. However, Sri Lanka national football team had managed to qualify for the semi-finals of the 2015 SAFF Championship.

== History ==
=== Early history ===
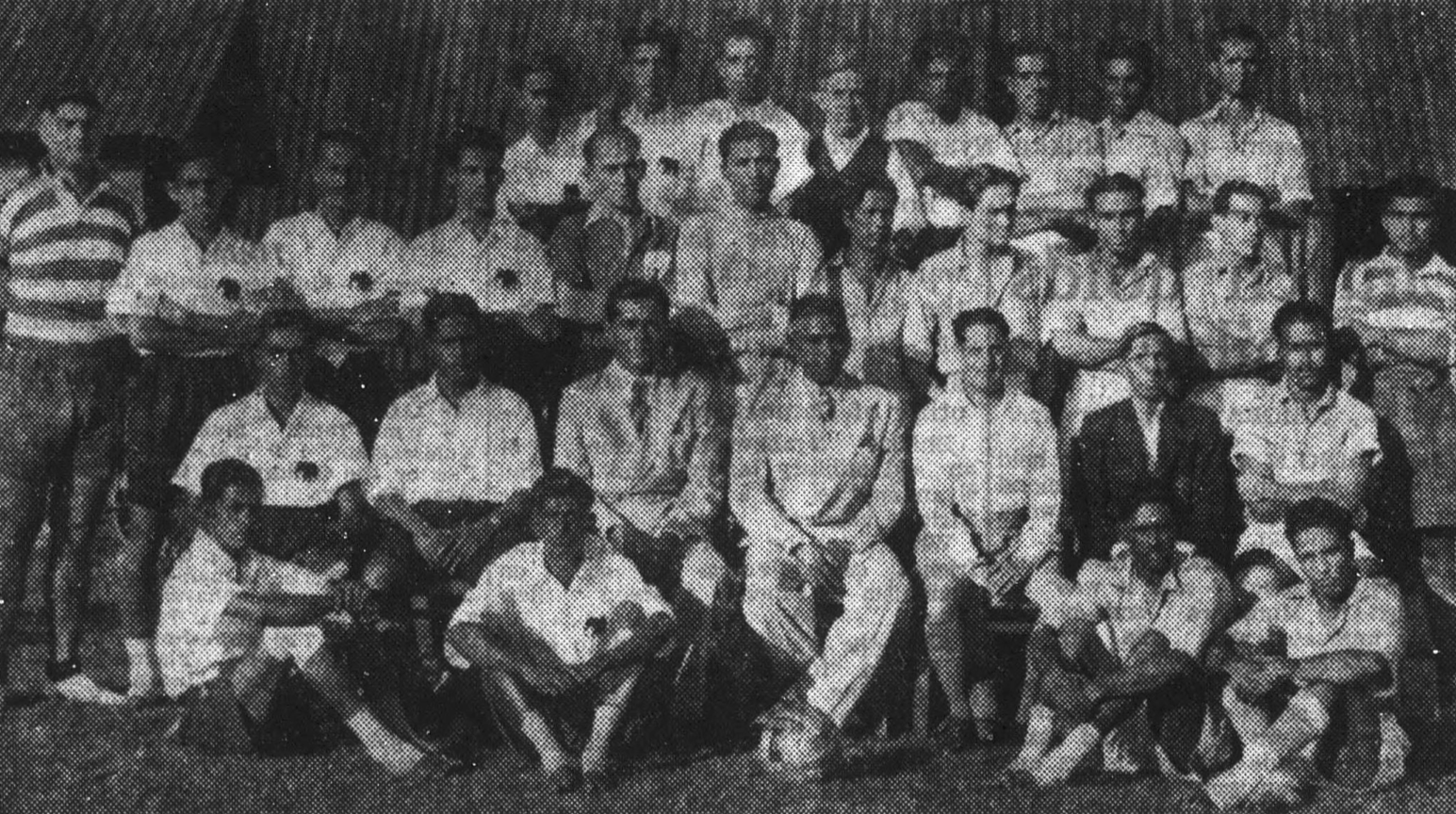
Ceylon and India national football teams pictured together during their friendly match in 1949

In January 1933, an All-Ceylon side lost 0–1 against the touring Indian football team. Though it was an All-Bengal team organised by the IFA, it was a de facto Indian national football team.

In 1939, the Ceylon Football Association was formed.

In 1946 and 1948, Ceylon played against touring Indian sides. In April 1949, the team played two test matches against the touring Indian national football team, losing 0–1 and 1–6 respectively. The same year, Ceylon played two matches against the touring Pakistani team Jinnah Gymkhana, losing 0–4 and 0–1.

=== FIFA recognition (1950s) ===
In 1952, Ceylon became a member of FIFA. The team participated in the 1952 Asian Quadrangular Football Tournament, held in Colombo. Later on, the team also participated in the 1953, 1954 and 1955 editions of the tournament.

In 1956, the team played two test matches against the touring Pakistan national team, losing and drawing once. The next year, Ceylon played against the touring Soviet team Neftyanik.

In 1958, the team toured the far east under the captainship of Tom Ossen.

=== 1960s ===
In January 1960, Ceylon played two test matches against touring soviet club Zenit Leningrad. The next year the team played test matches against touring Soviet club Spartak Praha Sokolovo and Brazilian club Madureira. Ceylon began participating in the Southern Pentangular Tournament, a regional football competition held among Ceylon and leading Indian state teams during the 1960s, later reduced to a quadrangular format in 1970. Ceylon took part in all editions held in 1961 (Bangalore), 1962 (Madras), 1963 (Colombo), 1964 (Andhra Pradesh), 1967 (Colombo), and 1970 (Colombo). The final edition in 1970, played at the Sugathadasa Stadium, saw Ceylon emerge as unbeaten champions, marking one of the national team's earliest major international achievements.

In 1963, Ceylon participated in the 1964 Summer Olympics qualifiers, losing against India in the home and away fixtures. The next year, the team played against the touring East Germany team, recording a 1–12 defeat. The same year, the team also played two tests against touring Indonesia.

On 28 February 1965, Ceylon secured their first international victory on home soil, defeating Pakistan 3–1 in a friendly at the Sugathadasa Stadium. The second friendly match was tied 0–0. The same year, the team toured Indonesia, and also played against German side 1. FC Nürnberg in home venue. In 1967, the team also played against touring American side Dallas Tornado, and Soviet team FK Žalgiris.

In 1966, Ceylon played two friendly matches against touring Burma, losing 0–3 and 1–3.

Ceylon participated in the 1968 Summer Olympics qualifiers, losing against Israel in both home and away fixtures. Later on, the team embarked on a tour in Israel and Germany, playing against local sides including clubs from Palenberg, Essen and Hamburg.

=== 1970s ===
In 1971, the team participated in the 1972 AFC Asian Cup qualification, losing all matches against Iraq, Jordan and Bahrain. The next year, the team again failed to advance at the 1972 Summer Olympics Qualifiers, losing all matches. Later on, the team also participated in the 1972 Jakarta Anniversary Tournament and the 1972 Merdeka Tournament. The same year, the team also played friendlies against Singapore in away venue and China in home. Soviet club Dinamo Tbilisi, who toured Ceylon also played test matches against the Ceylon national side.

In 1979, Sri Lanka featured in the 1980 AFC Asian Cup qualification, 1979 President's Cup Football Tournament and the 1979 King's Cup in Thailand. The team also played against Swedish club Kronängs IF; the tour was organised by Kronängs player Norman Alfonso, a former player of Saunders club of Sri Lanka.

=== 1980s ===
At the 1980 Summer Olympics Qualifiers, Sri Lanka failed to advance after losing against Singapore, North Korea, India, China and Iran.

In 1983, the team played friendlies against Maldives and Singapore. In 1984, after playing a friendly against the touring Maldives, the team participated in the 1984 AFC Asian Cup qualification. Sri Lanka participated in the 1986 Quaid-e-Azam International Tournament held in Islamabad, ending in the fourth position.

At the 1989 South Asian Games, the team failed to advance past the group stage.

=== Regional success (1990s) ===
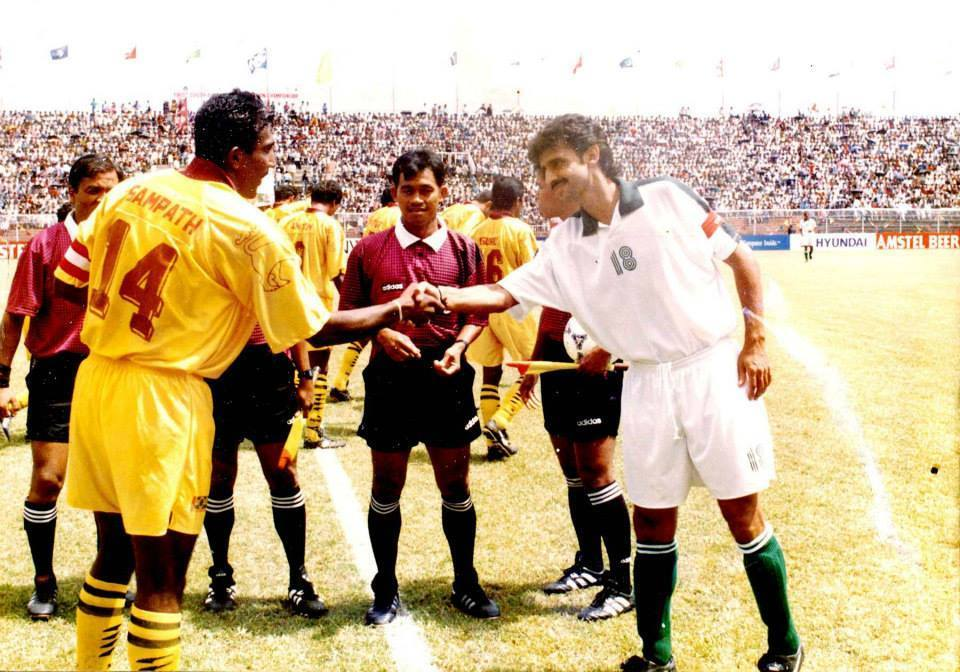
Sri Lanka and Pakistan during the Third-place match at the 1997 SAFF Gold Cup

The team participated at the 1991 South Asian Games, again ending unsuccessful.

In 1993, Sri Lanka participated for the first time at the 1994 FIFA World Cup qualification, losing all the matches. The same year, the team participated in the 1993 SAARC Gold Cup and the 1993 South Asian Games, achieving bronze, after defeating Maldives by 3–1 in the third place match.

In 1995, Sri Lanka made history winning the 1995 SAARC Gold Cup, after defeating India in the final by 1–0. At the 1995 South Asian Games, the team achieved bronze, after defeating Nepal in the penalty shootout after a goalless draw. The team also played at the Burma Tournament 1995.

In 1996, the team ended unsuccessful at the 1996 AFC Asian Cup qualification and the FIFA World Cup qualification.

At the 1997 SAFF Gold Cup, Sri Lanka was ousted in the semifinal after losing against eventual finalists Maldives. The next year the team played at the Bristol Freedom Cup organised by the Sri Lanka Football Federation. The team eventually lost in the final against India B.

In 1999, Sri Lanka participated in the 1999 SAFF Gold Cup, 1999 South Asian Games and the 2000 AFC Asian Cup qualification.

=== Decline (2000–2015) ===
Sri Lankan stiker Mohamed Izzadeen against Lebanon Centre-back Ali Al Saadi during the 3rd match of the 2009 Nehru Cup at the Ambedkar Stadium in New Delhi

During the early 21st century, Brazilian coach Marcos Ferreira led the team from 2000 to 2004, after which former national Sampath Perera took charge from 2004 to 2006. The Sri Lanka national football team experienced mixed fortunes on the regional stage while struggling to maintain consistency in continental qualifiers. The team's highest-profile achievement came at the 2006 AFC Challenge Cup, where they finished as runners-up against Tajikistan in a 0–4 defeat. In the same year the side advanced to the second round of qualification of the 2006 FIFA World Cup when they advanced past Laos in the preliminary stage, however failed to move on to the next stage. Regionally, Sri Lanka remained competitive in the SAFF Championship throughout the late 2000s, making back-to-back semi-final appearances in 2008 and 2009 however failed to move past the group stages at the 2011 and 2013 editions. The coaching setup continued to change through the decade, with South Korean manager Jang Jung guiding the side from 2007–2008, Sampath Perera returning in 2009, Mohamed Amanulla taking over in 2009–2010, followed by a second spell for Jang Jung, then further terms for Sampath Perera, before Brazilian Claudio Roberto and Serbian Nikola Kavazović led the side in 2013–2014 and 2014–2015 respectively. The team also competed in the 2008, 2010, and 2014 editions of the AFC Challenge Cup, though without matching its 2006 result. The team was invited to participate in the five-nation 2009 Nehru Cup in New Delhi, India. Sri Lanka launched their campaign with a memorable performance, pulling off a 4–3 upset over higher-ranked Lebanon. However, they were unable to maintain that momentum and suffered subsequent defeats to Syria (0–4) and hosts India (1–3), failing to advance past the round-robin stage. The 2010s subsequently marked a sharp decline in results and ranking.

=== Stagnation (2015–2022) ===
Sri Lanka was placed in the group with Malaysia and Bangladesh in the 2015 Bangabandhu Cup. In the first game Sri Lanka played against the Malaysian team. Malaysia won the match by 2–0. The second match was played against the host Bangladesh. Sri Lanka lost the game 1–0. Sri Lanka failed to score a goal in this tournament. After a six years of poor performance in the international football field Sri Lanka football team managed to qualify for the Semi Final of 2015 SAFF Championship. The poor performance continued in the Solidarity Cup as well. They had another shock defeat this time by the hands of Mongolia the lowest ranked team in Asia. As a result of this defeat Sri Lanka eliminated in the group stage of the tournament.

In July 2018, Sri Lanka faced Lithuania B, manahging a respectable 0–0 draw. During 2022 World Cup campaign however, Sri Lanka suffered another poor performance as the team fell 0–1 in Zhuhai to Macau. Macau was subsequently disqualified, as the team refused to travel to Sri Lanka in the aftermath of 2019 Sri Lanka Easter bombings, Sri Lanka was awarded a 3–0 win in response, thus qualified to the second round of the World Cup for the first time since 2006 campaign.

Sri Lanka's starting lineup for the Four Nations Football Tournament 2021 final

In the second round, Sri Lanka was drawn with four 2019 AFC Asian Cup participants, South Korea, North Korea, Lebanon and Turkmenistan.

In February 2020, the Football Federation of Sri Lanka announced the appointment of Bosnian-Australian specialist Amir Alagić as head coach of the national team. Sri Lanka then travelled to South Korea to finish their two remaining games against Lebanon and South Korea, losing both, yet optimism rose when Sri Lanka demonstrated an outstanding performance against Lebanon, scoring two goals and only lost by one goal margin, which was also the country's first-ever goals in the qualification. Alagić resigned as coach of Sri Lanka after the qualification, as Sri Lanka, rated as the weakest team in the group, were eliminated without scoring a point. He was replaced by Scottish manager, Andy Morrison.

=== FIFA suspension and resurgence (2023–present) ===
On 22 January 2023, FIFA announced the suspension of the FFSL from 21 January 2023 until further notice due to the government interference in football, but was provisionally included in the draw, pending a resolution. Therefore, all teams/clubs affiliated with the FFSL are no longer entitled to take part in international competitions. However, after the issue was settled, the ban was lifted allowing Sri Lanka to take part in the 2026 FIFA World Cup qualification under a strict condition: FFSL must conduct a new election ten days before the fixture against Yemen; failure to do so would result in automatic disqualification of the team. The suspension was lifted on 29 August 2023.

Sri Lanka then participated in the first round of the 2026 FIFA World Cup qualification facing against Yemen on 12 October 2023 but lost 4–1 on aggregate in the process. In September 2024, Sri Lanka then played in the 2027 AFC Asian Cup qualification play-off round against Cambodia in which the aggregate was tied on 2–2 where Claudio Kammerknecht scored in the 120+2th minute in extra time to send the game to penalties shoot-out. Sri Lanka came out victorious thus qualifying to the third round.

Bangladesh vs Sri Lanka in the 2026 SAFF Championship

In the third round of qualification, Sri Lanka were drawn into Group D alongside Thailand, Turkmenistan, and Chinese Taipei. On 5 June 2025, Sri Lanka won Chinese Taipei 3–1 on home soil. On October 9, 2025 they defeated Turkmenistan 1–0 in an AFC Asian Cup Qualifier. On October 14, 2025 the team lost to Turkmenistan 2-1. On November 18, 2025 the team lost to Thailand 0-4. The team won 1–3 against Chinese Taipei on March 31, 2026.

== Team image ==
=== Kit and crest ===
==== Kit suppliers ====
Kit supplier	Period	Ref
(United States) Nike	Until 2002	
(Germany) Adidas	2003	
(Thailand) FBT	2004–2006	
(Germany) Adidas	2008–2009	
(Thailand) FBT	2012	
(Thailand) Grand Sport	2015	
(Sri Lanka) Captain	2019	
(Sri Lanka) Nexxus Sports	2023–present	

==== Team crest ====
The team's crest features a blue and gold colour scheme, with a yellow lion holding a sword on a deep blue background. White is used for the text and border. These colours are reflected in the kits.

The team currently wears a predominantly white home kit and a blue away kit, introduced in 2023. The home kit is primarily white, with a blue and yellow dotted gradient pattern across the chest and lower sections, complemented by blue detailing and yellow-and-blue side panels, and is paired with white shorts and socks. The away kit is predominantly blue with a lighter dotted pattern, and is paired with blue shorts and socks; it also features white names and numbers with subtle yellow accents.

Traditionally, the team wore gold and blue as their primary home colours, while white with gold elements was used for the away kit.

=== Home stadiums ===
==== Colombo Racecourse ====
The Colombo Racecourse, located in Colombo, serves as the current home venue of the Sri Lanka national football team. Originally opened in 1893 as a horse racing track, the venue was repurposed as an airfield by the Royal Air Force during World War II. In the early 2010s, the ground underwent significant renovations to convert it into a modern football and multi-sport stadium.

Following a hiatus of more than three years in international football matches in Sri Lanka, the Colombo Racecourse hosted its first senior international match on 8 July 2018, a friendly between Sri Lanka and Lithuania B, which ended in a 0–0 draw.

As of 2025, the stadium has served as the national team's primary home ground, replacing the Sugathadasa Stadium in this role since 2015. It has a seating capacity of approximately 10,000 and includes facilities suitable for international competition.

==== Sugathadasa Stadium ====
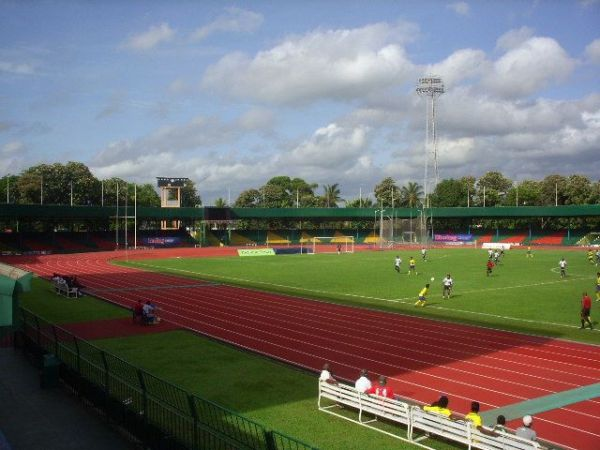
Sugathadasa Stadium

Sugathadasa Stadium is the former athletic stadium in Sri Lanka. It was established in 1972 and has a capacity of 28,000. The stadium is mostly used for athletics and football. The 1995 and 2008 SAFF Championship tournaments were held in this stadium. This is the home stadium of Sri Lanka National Football Team. Sri Lanka won their first major football tournament in his stadium. It was defeating India in the Final of 1995 SAFF Championship.

All the FIFA World Cup qualification matches of Sri Lankan team prior to 2016 played in this ground. Major football tournaments that played in here were the AFC President's Cup and AFC Challenge Cup.

The last international match played at Sugathadasa took place on 12 March 2015, against Bhutan in a 2018 FIFA World Cup qualifying fixture.

==== Kalutara Stadium ====
The Kalutara Stadium, also known as the Vernon Fernando Stadium or locally as the Kalutara Park Ground, is a multi-purpose venue in Kalutara with a capacity of around 15,000. It is primarily used for domestic club football. The last recorded international match played here was a friendly between Sri Lanka and Pakistan on 25 March 2002.

== Results and fixtures ==
The following is a list of match results in the last 12 months, as well as any future matches that have been scheduled.

Win Draw Loss Fixture

=== 2026 ===
31 March 2027 AFC Asian Cup Q	Chinese Taipei	1–3	Sri Lanka	Taipei, Taiwan
18:30 UTC+7	Yu Yao-hsing 55'	Report; Report (AFC)	Suresh 18'; Senthurvasan 26'; Tiao 53' (o.g.)	Stadium: Taipei Municipal Stadium; Attendance: 1,556; Referee: Jansen Foo (Singapore)

8 June Friendly	Bhutan	1–4	Sri Lanka	Bangkok, Thailand
	R. Dorji 80'		Dekker 16'; Bharath 63'; Razeek 78'; Rahul 92'	Stadium: NT Stadium; Referee: Wiwat Jumpaoon (Thailand)

27 September Friendly	Seychelles	0–3	Sri Lanka	Victoria, Seychelles
17:30 UTC+5:30		Report	Rajamohan 45+2' (pen.), 52'; De Silva 76'	Stadium: Stade Linité

30 September Friendly	Seychelles	0–2	Sri Lanka	Victoria, Seychelles
18:30 UTC+5:30		Report	De Silva 32'; Razeek 84'	Stadium: Stade Linité

2 October Unofficial friendly	Mauritius	3–0	Sri Lanka	Saint Pierre, Mauritius
19:00 UTC+4	De Robillard 28' (pen.); W. François 33'; A. François 59'	Report		Stadium: Côte d'Or National Sports Complex

5 October Friendly	Sri Lanka	3–2	Mauritius	Saint Pierre, Mauritius
17:30 4:00	Bharath 20'; Senthurvasan 40'; Durrant 70'	Report	de Robillard 7'; Francois 83'	Stadium: Côte d'Or National Sports Complex

8 November 2026 SAFF Championship	Sri Lanka	2–2	Bhutan	Dhaka, Bangladesh
20:00 UTC+6	Kelaart 35'; Razeek 43'	SAFF; FIFA	Tshering 34'; Gyeltshen 76'	Stadium: National Stadium; Attendance: 1,012; Referee: Mohammed Khalfan Al Manai (Oman)

11 November 2026 SAFF Championship	Sri Lanka	0–4	Bangladesh	Dhaka, Bangladesh
20:00 UTC+6		SAFF; FIFA	Shome 8'; Choudhury 44'; Wahid 53'; Rakib 87'	Stadium: National Stadium; Attendance: 18,631; Referee: Lê Vũ Linh (Vietnam)

== Coaching staff ==
Position	Name
Head coach	(Kuwait) Abdullah Al Mutairi
Assistant coach	(Kuwait) Majeed Al Kaanani (Kuwait) Tahir Al Jalali
Goalkeeping coach	(Kuwait) Nawwaf Hussein
Performance analyst	(Kuwait) Sulaiman Al Ghanim
Team doctor	(Kuwait) Shams-ul-din Al Daheri
Physiotherapist	(Kuwait) Ahmad Al Marzouqi
Masseur	(Kuwait) Saleh Al Mabkout
Kitman	(Kuwait) Ali-Hussein Al Blooshi
Media officer	(Kuwait) Abdulelah Al Shamshiri
Team manager	(Kuwait) Osama Al Kaabi

=== Coaching history ===
- (Sri Lanka) V. Nadarajah (1963)
- (Germany) Karl-Heinz Weigang (1964–1965)
- (Sri Lanka) Neville Abeygunawardena (1965–??)
- (Sri Lanka) V. Nadarajah (1969)
- (Sri Lanka) Lawrence Fernando (1970–1975)
- (Sri Lanka) P. D. Sirisena (1976–1990)
- (Sri Lanka) Joe Ariyapala (1982–1983)
- (Sri Lanka) Neville Abeygunawardena (1984)
- (Sri Lanka) Neville Dias (1990)
- (Germany) Burkhard Pape (1991–1992)
- (Brazil) Jorge Ferreira (1993–1995)
- (Sri Lanka) P. D. Sirisena (1996)
- Unknown (1997–1998)
- (Sri Lanka) Subhani Hassimdeen (1999)
- (Malaysia) M. Karathu (1999–2000)
- (Brazil) Marcos Ferreira (2000–2004)
- (Sri Lanka) Sampath Perera (2004–2006)
- (South Korea) Jang Jung (2007–2008)
- (Sri Lanka) Sampath Perera (2009)
- (Sri Lanka) Mohamed Amanulla (2009–2010)
- (South Korea) Jang Jung (2010–2011)
- (Sri Lanka) Sampath Perera (2011–2013)
- (Brazil) Claudio Roberto (2013–2014)
- (Serbia) Nikola Kavazović (2014–2015)
- (Sri Lanka) Sampath Perera (2015–2016)
- (Sri Lanka) Dudley Steinwall (2016–2018)
- (Sri Lanka) Nizam Pakeer Ali (2018–2020)
- (Bosnia and Herzegovina) (Australia) Amir Alagić (2020–2022)
- (Sri Lanka) Mohamed Hassan Roomy (2022)
- (Scotland) Andy Morrison (2022–2024)
- (Kuwait) Abdullah Al Mutairi (2024–present)

== Players ==
=== Current squad ===
The following 28 players were called up for the 2026 SAFF Championship.

Caps and goals are correct as of 30 September 2026 after the game against Seychelles.

No.	Pos.	Player	Date of birth (age)	Caps	Goals	Club
1	GK	Sujan Perera (captain)	18 July 1992 (age 34)	66	0	(Bangladesh Football Federation) Fortis FC
	GK	Mohamed Mursith	4 January 2001 (age 25)	1	0	(Football Federation of Sri Lanka) Blue Star
	GK	Kaveesh Lakpriya Fernando	10 January 1995 (age 31)	3	0	(Football Federation of Sri Lanka) Blue Star
	DF	Ayman Zawahir	18 October 2007 (age 19)	0	0	(Football Australia) Avondale FC
	DF	Jason Thayaparan	1 October 1995 (age 31)	14	0	(German Football Association) Rot-Weiß Walldorf
	DF	Claudio Kammerknecht	26 July 1999 (age 27)	12	1	(German Football Association) Waldhof Mannheim
3	DF	William Thomason	28 June 2002 (age 24)	6	0	(Football Australia) Olympic FC
2	DF	Anujan Rajendram	11 May 2000 (age 26)	19	0	(Norwegian Football Federation) Vindbjart FK
18	DF	Barath Suresh	11 June 2003 (age 23)	17	1	(Football Australia) Langwarrin
14	DF	Steven Sacayaradjy	22 January 1997 (age 29)	12	0	(French Football Federation) FC Borgo
	DF	Jude Supan	30 July 1998 (age 28)	30	0	(Football Federation of Sri Lanka) Up Country Lions
	DF	Chalana Chameera	10 January 1993 (age 33)	38	0	(Football Federation of Sri Lanka) Colombo FC
	MF	Geremi Perera	25 March 2004 (age 22)	2	0	(German Football Association) SC Eltersdorf
12	MF	Leon Perera	1 January 1997 (age 29)	17	2	(German Football Association) Lüneburger SK Hansa
	MF	Adhavan Rajamohan	21 February 1993 (age 33)	19	2	(Swedish Football Association) FC Järfälla
6	MF	Garrett Kelly	29 April 1996 (age 30)	13	0	(Kyrgyz Football Union) FC Alay
17	MF	Niloshan Senthurvasan	10 March 2002 (age 24)	8	1	(Norwegian Football Federation) Lillehammer FK
11	MF	Dillon De Silva	18 April 2002 (age 24)	29	5	(The Football Association) Oxford City
	MF	Aman Faizer	12 March 1999 (age 27)	24	0	(Football Federation of Sri Lanka) Renown Sports Club
19	MF	Muhammedhu Munsif	28 November 1999 (age 26)	3	0	(Football Federation of Sri Lanka) YSSC
	FW	Regize Canistan	25 October 1997 (age 29)	1	0	(French Football Federation) Entente SSG
	FW	Sam Durrant	25 October 2002 (age 24)	19	0	(Cyprus Football Association) Karmiotissa FC
	FW	Ahmed Waseem Razeek	13 September 1994 (age 32)	35	12	Free agent
	FW	Oliver Kelaart	16 April 1998 (age 28)	23	3	(Football Australia) Altona Magic SC
	FW	Wade Dekker	21 April 1994 (age 32)	16	2	(Football Australia) Dandenong City SC
7	FW	Rahul Suresh	4 June 2004 (age 22)	12	2	(Football Australia) Dandenong Thunder
	FW	Remiyan Muthuccumaru	19 April 2007 (age 19)	2	0	(Royal Dutch Football Association) FC Emmen
	FW	Mohammad Hasmeer	7 October 1999 (age 27)	9	0	(Football Federation of Sri Lanka) Navy Sea Hawks FC

=== Recent call-ups ===
The following players have been called up for the team within the last 12 months and are still available for selection.

Pos.	Player	Date of birth (age)	Caps	Goals	Club	Latest call-up
DF	Zahi Addis	11 September 2003 (age 23)	4	0	(Australia) Hume City FC	v. Bhutan; 8 June 2026^{PRE}
Notes: ^{INJ} Withdrew due to injury; ^{PRE} Preliminary squad / standby; ^{RET} Retired from the national team; ^{SUS} Serving suspension; ^{WD} Withdrew due to non-injury issue

== Player records ==
As of 5 October 2026
Players in bold are still active with Sri Lanka.

=== Most appearances ===
Rank	Player	Caps	Goals	Period
1	Channa Ediri Bandanage	70	18	1999–2009
2	**Sujan Perera**	67	0	2011–present
3	Kasun Jayasuriya	60	28	1999–2009
4	Dudley Steinwall	51	3	1993–2009
5	Chathura Maduranga	50	7	2001–2009
6	**Chalana Chameera**	39	0	2015–present
6	Chathura Gunaratne	39	8	2006–2013
6	Kavindu Ishan	39	1	2013–2023
9	Kamaldeen Fuard	38	0	2000–2006
10	Harsha Fernando	37	0	2018–2025

=== Top goalscorers ===
Rank	Player	Goals	Caps	Ratio	Period
1	Kasun Jayasuriya	28	60	0.47	1999–2009
2	Channa Ediri Bandanage	18	70	0.26	1999–2009
3	Roshan Perera	17	36	0.47	1993–2001
4	**Ahmed Waseem Razeek**	12	36	0.33	2019–present
5	Mohamed Izzadeen	9	34	0.26	2004–2015
6	Chathura Gunaratne	8	39	0.21	2006–2013
7	Chathura Madurangha	7	50	0.14	2001–2009
8	Mohamed Amanulla	6	11	0.55	1995–2000
8	Peter Ranasinghe	6	—	—	1953–1963
9	**Dillon De Silva**	5	31	0.16	2021–present
10	Chaminda Steinwall	4	—	—	1989–1996
10	Anton Silva	4	—	—	1989–1996
10	**Adhavan Rajamohan**	4	26	0.15	2023–present

== Competitive record ==
=== FIFA World Cup ===
FIFA World Cup									Qualification					
Year	Result	Position	Pld	W	D	L	F	A	Pld	W	D	L	F	A
(Uruguay) 1930	Part of the United Kingdom								Part of the United Kingdom					
(Italy) 1934	Part of the United Kingdom								Part of the United Kingdom					
(France) 1938	Part of the United Kingdom								Part of the United Kingdom					
(Brazil) 1950	Not a FIFA Member								Not a FIFA Member					
(Switzerland) 1954	Did not enter								Did not enter					
(Sweden) 1958	Did not enter								Did not enter					
(Chile) 1962	Did not enter								Did not enter					
(England) 1966	Did not enter								Did not enter					
(Mexico) 1970	Did not enter								Did not enter					
(West Germany) 1974	Did not enter								Did not enter					
(Argentina) 1978	Did not enter								Did not enter					
(Spain) 1982	Did not enter								Did not enter					
(Mexico) 1986	Did not enter								Did not enter					
(Italy) 1990	Did not enter								Did not enter					
(United States) 1994	Did not qualify								8	0	0	8	0	26
(France) 1998	Did not qualify								3	1	1	1	4	4
(South Korea) (Japan) 2002	Did not qualify								6	1	1	4	8	20
(Germany) 2006	Did not qualify								8	1	3	4	7	11
(South Africa) 2010	Did not qualify								2	0	0	2	0	6
(Brazil) 2014	Did not qualify								2	0	1	1	1	5
(Russia) 2018	Did not qualify								2	0	0	2	1	3
(Qatar) 2022	Did not qualify								8	1	0	7	5	24
(Canada) (Mexico) (United States) 2026	Did not qualify								2	0	1	1	1	4
(Morocco) (Portugal) (Spain) 2030	To be determined								To be determined					
(Saudi Arabia) 2034	To be determined								To be determined					
Total	0/9	—							41	4	7	30	27	103

=== AFC Asian Cup ===
AFC Asian Cup									Qualification					
Year	Result	Position	Pld	W	D	L	GF	GA	Pld	W	D*	L	GF	GA
(Hong Kong) 1956 to (Iran) 1968	Withdrew								Withdrew					
(Thailand) 1972	Did not qualify								3	0	0	3	1	10
(Iran) 1976	Withdrew								Withdrew					
(Kuwait) 1980	Did not qualify								4	1	0	3	5	12
(Singapore) 1984	Did not qualify								4	1	1	2	6	11
(Qatar) 1988 to (Japan) 1992	Did not enter								Did not enter					
(United Arab Emirates) 1996	Did not qualify								6	2	0	4	5	25
(Lebanon) 2000	Did not qualify								4	0	0	4	2	18
(China) 2004	Did not qualify								8	2	0	6	6	26
(Indonesia) (Malaysia) (Thailand) (Vietnam) 2007	Did not enter								Did not enter					
(Qatar) 2011	Did not qualify								AFC Challenge Cup					
(Australia) 2015	Did not qualify								AFC Challenge Cup					
(United Arab Emirates) 2019	Did not qualify								2	0	0	2	1	3
(Qatar) 2023	Did not qualify								11	1	0	10	5	30
(Saudi Arabia) 2027	Did not qualify								10	3	3	4	11	15
Total	0/19	—							52	10	4	38	42	151

=== SAFF Championship ===
Year	Result	Position	Pld	W	D	L	GF	GA
(Pakistan) 1993	Runners-up	2nd	3	1	1	1	4	2
(Sri Lanka) 1995	Champions	1st	3	2	1	0	5	3
(Nepal) 1997	Semi-finals	4th	4	2	0	2	6	3
(India) 1999	Group stage	5th	2	0	1	1	2	3
(Bangladesh) 2003	Group stage	5th	3	1	1	1	3	3
(Pakistan) 2005	Group stage	7th	3	0	0	3	1	5
(Maldives) (Sri Lanka) 2008	Semi-finals	3rd	4	2	1	1	5	3
(Bangladesh) 2009	Semi-finals	4th	4	2	0	2	9	7
(India) 2011	Group stage	6th	3	1	0	2	4	6
(Nepal) 2013	Group stage	7th	3	1	0	2	6	15
(India) 2015	Semi-finals	4th	3	1	0	2	1	7
(Bangladesh) 2018	Group stage	6th	2	0	1	1	0	2
(Maldives) 2021	Group stage	5th	4	0	1	3	2	5
(India) 2023	Did not participate							
(Bangladesh) 2026	To be determined							
Total	14/15	1st	41	13	7	21	48	64

=== AFC Challenge Cup ===
AFC Challenge Cup									Qualification					
Year	Result	Position	Pld	W	D	L	GF	GA	Pld	W	D*	L	GF	GA
(Bangladesh) 2006	Runners-up	2nd	6	4	1	2	7	2	No qualifying round					
(India) 2008	Group stage	7th	3	0	0	3	1	9	3	2	1	0	14	4
(Sri Lanka) 2010	Group stage	5th	3	1	0	2	4	7	3	2	1	0	9	4
(Nepal) 2012	Did not qualify								3	0	1	2	0	5
(Maldives) 2014	Did not qualify								3	1	0	2	5	5
Total	3/5	Runners-up	12	5	1	7	12	18	12	5	3	4	28	18

- In 2011 and 2015 The AFC Challenge Cup acted as the qualification for the Asian Cup.
- The AFC Challenge Cup was cancelled by the AFC.

=== AFC Solidarity Cup ===
Year	Result	Position	Pld	W	D	L	GF	GA
(Malaysia) 2016	Group stage	6th	3	0	1	2	2	5

== Head-to-head record ==
Last update was against Mauritius on 5 October 2026.

Country	Matches	Win	Draw	Loss	GF	GA	GD	Win/Draw %
Afghanistan	8	1	1	6	6	17	−11	25.00
Bahrain	2	0	0	2	0	4	−4	00.00
Bangladesh	20	5	2	13	15	30	−15	25.00
Bhutan	9	7	0	2	24	6	+18	77.77
Brunei	5	3	0	2	7	3	+4	60.00
Cambodia	5	2	1	2	4	12	−8	40.00
China	2	0	0	2	2	4	−2	00.00
Chinese Taipei	4	3	1	0	10	5	+5	75.00
East Germany	1	0	0	1	1	12	−11	00.00
Guam	1	1	0	0	5	1	+4	100.00
Hong Kong	1	0	0	1	0	5	−5	00.00
India	19	2	5	12	13	32	−19	11.11
Indonesia	6	0	1	5	6	29	−23	33.33
Iran	2	0	0	2	0	11	−11	00.00
Japan	3	0	0	3	0	16	−16	00.00
Jordan	1	0	0	1	1	2	−1	00.00
Kyrgyzstan	1	0	0	1	1	4	−3	00.00
Laos	8	3	2	3	13	11	+2	62.50
Lebanon	5	1	0	4	6	18	−12	25.00
Lithuania	2	0	1	1	0	2	−2	00.00
Macau	3	1	1	1	4	2	+2	66.66
Malaysia	10	1	0	9	7	36	−29	10.00
Maldives	22	2	10	10	17	42	−25	9.09
Mauritius	2	1	0	1	3	5	−2	50.00
Mongolia	2	1	0	1	3	2	+1	50.00
Myanmar	9	2	1	6	10	20	−10	22.22
North Korea	3	0	0	3	0	8	−8	00.00
Nepal	17	6	7	4	25	19	+6	37.50
Oman	3	0	1	2	1	14	−13	00.00
Pakistan	19	8	4	7	31	25	+6	63.16
Palestine	1	0	0	1	0	2	−2	00.00
Philippines	4	1	1	2	5	9	−4	50.00
Qatar	3	0	0	3	0	9	−9	00.00
Saudi Arabia	3	0	0	3	0	9	−9	00.00
Singapore	5	1	0	4	6	15	−9	20.00
South Korea	3	0	0	3	0	19	−19	00.00
Seychelles	6	3	1	2	10	8	+2	50.00
Sudan	1	0	0	1	0	1	−1	00.00
Syria	3	0	0	3	0	17	−17	00.00
Tajikistan	4	0	1	3	3	11	−8	00.00
Thailand	9	0	0	9	2	27	−25	00.00
Timor-Leste	1	1	0	0	3	2	+1	100.00
Turkmenistan	8	1	1	6	4	14	−10	12.50
United Arab Emirates	8	0	0	8	3	35	−32	00.00
Uzbekistan	2	0	0	2	0	9	−9	00.00
Vietnam	4	0	3	1	6	7	−1	30.00
Yemen	4	1	1	2	2	6	−4	40.00
Total	278	59	49	160	263	600	−337	21.22

== Honours ==
=== Continental ===
- AFC Challenge Cup
  - (silver) Runners-up (1): 2006

=== Regional ===
- SAFF Championship
  - (gold) Champions (1): 1995
  - (silver) Runners-up (1): 1993
- South Asian Games
  - (bronze) Bronze Medal (2): 1993, 1995

=== Summary ===
Only official honours are included, according to FIFA statutes (competitions organized/recognized by FIFA or an affiliated confederation).

Competition	1st place, gold medalist(s)	2nd place, silver medalist(s)	3rd place, bronze medalist(s)	Total
AFC Challenge Cup	0	1	0	1
Total	0	1	0	1

== See also ==
- Sri Lanka women's national football team
- Sri Lanka national under-23 football team
- Sri Lanka national under-20 football team
- Sri Lanka national under-17 football team

Preceded by 1993 India	South Asian Champions; 1995 (First title)	Succeeded by 1997 India
