= Adhavan Rajamohan =

Sri Lankan footballer (born 1993)

Personal information
- Full name: Adhavan Rajamohan Govindarajah
- Date of birth: 21 February 1993 (age 33)
- Place of birth: Spånga, Sweden
- Height: 1.84 m (6 ft 0 in)
- Position: Midfielder

Team information
- Current team: FC Järfälla
- Number: 21

Youth career
- –2012: AIK

Senior career*
Years	Team	Apps	(Gls)
2013–2020	Akropolis IF	160	(46)
2021–2022	Degerfors IF	27	(0)
2023	Paradiso	3	(0)
2023–2024	Nordic United	10	(0)
2024–2025	IFK Haninge	21	(4)
2026–	FC Järfälla	18	(2)

International career^{‡}
2023–	Sri Lanka	26	(4)
- * Club domestic league appearances and goals as of 16 November 2026 ‡ National team caps and goals as of 5 October 2026

Adhavan Rajamohan Govindarajah (Tamil: அதவன் ராஜமோகன் கோவிந்தராஜா; born 21 February 1993) is a professional footballer who plays as a midfielder for Ettan club FC Järfälla. Born in Sweden, he represents the Sri Lanka national team.

== Early life ==
Adhavan was born in Spånga, Sweden, to Sri Lankan Tamil parents.

== Club career ==
He started at AIK's youth academy, before moving to Akropolis IF in 2013. There, playing primarily as a winger, he made 160 appearances and scored 46 goals. In 2021 he moved to Degerfors IF, marking his entry into Sweden's top-tier league, Allsvenskan.

Adhavan's next move took him beyond Sweden for the first time when he joined FC Paradiso in Switzerland, competing in the 1. Liga Classic. After his time in Switzerland, he returned to Sweden, joining Nordic United FC in Ettan Fotboll and later moved to IFK Haninge in Division 2 of Sweden.

== International career ==
Being born in Sweden to Sri Lankan parents, Rajamohan was eligible to play for either Sweden or Sri Lanka.

Rajamohan first received a call-up from the Football Federation of Sri Lanka to join the national team camp in Qatar in 2022. He made his official debut for Sri Lanka on 12 October 2023 during the 2026 FIFA World Cup qualification, playing as a defensive midfielder against Yemen in Saudi Arabia under coach Andy Morrison.

Rajanmohan scored his first international goal on 20 March 2025 in a friendly against Laos at the New Laos National Stadium.

== Career statistics ==
=== International ===
As of 5 October 2026

Appearances and goals by national team and year
National team	Year	Apps	Goals
Sri Lanka	2023	2	0
Sri Lanka	2024	10	0
Sri Lanka	2025	6	2
Sri Lanka	2026	8	2
Total		26	4

=== International goals ===
Scores and results list Sri Lanka's goal tally first.

No.	Date	Venue	Opponent	Score	Result	Competition
1.	20 March 2025	New Laos National Stadium, Vientiane, Laos	Laos	2–0	2–1	Friendly
2.	10 June 2025	Colombo Racecourse, Colombo, Sri Lanka	Chinese Taipei	1–0	3–1	2027 AFC Asian Cup Q
3.	27 September 2026	Stade Linité, Victoria, Seychelles	Seychelles	1–0	3–0	Friendly
4.	27 September 2026	Stade Linité, Victoria, Seychelles	Seychelles	2–0	3–0	Friendly
