= Madushan =

Madushan is both a given name and a surname. Notable people with the name include:

- Madushan Ravichandrakumar (born 1994), Sri Lankan cricketer
- Asela Madushan, Sri Lankan footballer
- Buddika Madushan (born 1990), Sri Lankan cricketer
- Chathuranga Madushan, Sri Lankan footballer
- Kavindu Madushan (born 1997), Sri Lankan model, dancer, choreographer and television actor
- Lakshitha Madushan (born 1992), Sri Lankan cricketer
- Pasindu Madushan (born 1992), Sri Lankan cricketer
- Pramod Madushan (born 1993), Sri Lankan cricketer
- Sameendra Madushan (born 1987), Sri Lankan cricketer
- Subash Madushan, Sri Lankan footballer
- Udith Madushan (born 1997), Sri Lankan cricketer

== See also ==
- Madushan Dam, dam in China
