= SC Eltersdorf =

German association football club from the Eltersdorf district of Erlangen, Bavaria

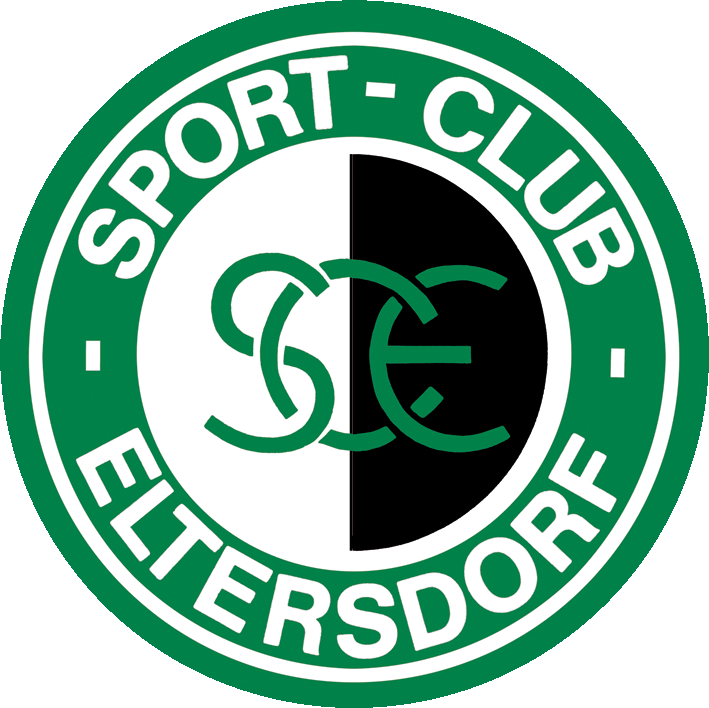
- Full name: Sport-Club 1926 e. V. Eltersdorf
- Founded: 1926
- Ground: Sportanlage Langenau
- Chairman: Andreas Berlet
- Manager: Bernd Eigner
- League: Regionalliga Bayern (IV)
- 2025–26: Bayernliga Nord, 1st of 18 (promoted)
Home colours	Away colours

The SC Eltersdorf is a German association football club from the Eltersdorf district of Erlangen, Bavaria.

An amateur club who has mostly played in the lower leagues of Bavaria, the club achieved its greatest success in 2011–12 when it earned promotion to the Regionalliga.

== History ==
While football was played in Eltersdorf as early as 1909, in the form of the Franken Eltersdorf, the current club dates back to 1926. With support from another local working maes club, the ATSV Erlangen, ATSV Eltersdorf was formed in 1926.

The new club only lasted for a decade before the Nazis outlawed it because of its working-class background. A new club was formed instead, the DTV 1936 Eltersdorf. This club, in turned only lasted for another decade before it disappeared with the end of the Second World War. On 3 March 1946, the current Sportklub Eltersdorf was formed, which nevertheless saw its roots in the old 1926 club, which it claims as its formation year. Most likely, the current name, Sport-Club 1926 e.V. Eltersdorf, was adopted in 1963.

SCE spend the better part of its existence as a non-descript amateur side in the lower league of Bavarian football until 1999, when a championship in the Bezirksliga Mittelfranken-Nord (VII) gained it promotion to the Bezirksoberliga Mittelfranken. At this level, the club spent only two seasons before another title moved the team up to the tier-five Landesliga Bayern-Mitte.

SC Eltersdorf spend the next ten seasons at this level without looking like a promotion contender. In 2007–08 the club came close to relegation, finishing 15th in the league. Gradual improvement saw the team finish fifth in 2010 before taking the out the league title in the following year and gaining entry to Bavaria's highest football league.

In 2009, the club was also able to take out the Middle Franconian Cup, a competition since replaced by the enlarged Bavarian Cup, making SCE the last winners. After the promotion of Eltersdorf to the Bayernliga in 2011 the club began to hold merger talks with FSV Erlangen-Bruck in November 2011.

At the end of the 2011–12 season the club managed to finish in the top nine of the Bayernliga and thereby directly qualified for the new tier four Regionalliga Bayern. In the 2012–13 season the club struggled in the bottom region of the table all season and was eventually relegated back to the Bayernliga.

== Current squad ==
As of 8 September 2026

Note: Flags indicate national team as defined under FIFA eligibility rules; some limited exceptions apply. Players may hold more than one non-FIFA nationality.

No.	Pos.	Nation	Player
1	GK	GER	Axel Hofmann
2	DF	GRE	Valantis Floros
3	DF	GER	Nicolas Rutkowski
4	DF	GER	Korbinian Stütz
5	MF	SRI	Geremi Perera
6	DF	GER	Niclas Egerer
7	MF	GER	Manfred Strobel
8	MF	GER	Leo Sommer
9	FW	GER	Yannik Jassmann
10	MF	GER	Maximilian Göbhardt
11	FW	TUR	Calvin Sengül
13	MF	GER	Karim Said
14	DF	GER	Patrick Ort
15	FW	GER	Moritz Fischer

No.	Pos.	Nation	Player
16	MF	GER	Marco Niedermayer
17	MF	GER	Samuel Arles
18	MF	GER	Manuel Stark
19	DF	GER	Nicolas Böhnke
20	DF	JPN	Hiroki Akimoto
21	DF	GER	Andre Karmann
22	MF	GER	Enrike Catalan Keck
23	MF	GER	Tom Feulner
25	GK	UKR	Oleksandr Churilov
27	MF	GER	Robin Renner
28	DF	GER	Sebastian Marx
30	GK	GER	Moritz Prenzler
34	MF	GER	Ensar Rexhepi
42	FW	AUT	Felix Rippert

== Honors ==
The club's honors:

Year	Category	Event	Status
1999	League	Bezirksliga Mittelfranken-Nord	Champion
2001	League	Bezirksoberliga Mittelfranken	Champion
2005	Cup	Mittelfranken Cup	Runner-up
2009	Cup	Mittelfranken Cup	Winner
2011	League	Landesliga Bayern-Mitte	Champion
2012	Cup	Bavarian Cup	Runner-up
2026	League	Bayernliga	Champion

== Recent managers ==
Recent managers of the club:

Manager	Start	Finish
Andreas Speer	November 2002	3 September 2010
Ludwig Preis	4 September 2010	31 December 2012
Dieter Lieberwirth	1 January 2013	31 May 2013
Hendrik Baumgart	6 June 2013	30 June 2016
Bernd Eigner	1 July 2016	Present

== Recent seasons ==
The recent season-by-season performance of the club:

Season	Division	Tier	Position
1999–2000	Bezirksoberliga Mittelfranken	VI	5th
2000–01	Bezirksoberliga Mittelfranken	VI	1st ↑
2001–02	Landesliga Bayern-Mitte	V	12th
2002–03	Landesliga Bayern-Mitte	V	8th
2003–04	Landesliga Bayern-Mitte	V	7th
2004–05	Landesliga Bayern-Mitte	V	8th
2005–06	Landesliga Bayern-Mitte	V	5th
2006–07	Landesliga Bayern-Mitte	V	11th
2007–08	Landesliga Bayern-Mitte	V	15th
2008–09	Landesliga Bayern-Mitte	VI	13th
2009–10	Landesliga Bayern-Mitte	VI	5th
2010–11	Landesliga Bayern-Mitte	VI	1st ↑
2011–12	Bayernliga	V	3rd ↑
2012–13	Regionalliga Bayern	IV	18th ↓
2013–14	Bayernliga	V	8th
2014–15	Bayernliga Nord	V	7th
2015–16	Bayernliga Nord	V	7th
2016–17	Bayernliga Nord	V	8th
2017–18	Bayernliga Nord	V	4th
2018–19	Bayernliga Nord	V	6th
2019–21	Bayernliga Nord	V	1st ↑
2021–22	Regionalliga Bayern	IV	16th ↓
2022–23	Bayernliga Nord	V	3rd
2023–24	Bayernliga Nord	V	3rd
2024–25	Bayernliga Nord	V	2nd
2025–26	Bayernliga Nord	V	1st ↑
2026–27	Regionalliga Bayern	IV	

- With the introduction of the Bezirksoberligas in 1988 as the new fifth tier, below the Landesligas, all leagues below dropped one tier. With the introduction of the Regionalligas in 1994 and the 3. Liga in 2008 as the new third tier, below the 2. Bundesliga, all leagues below dropped one tier. With the establishment of the Regionalliga Bayern as the new fourth tier in Bavaria in 2012 the Bayernliga was split into a northern and a southern division, the number of Landesligas expanded from three to five and the Bezirksoberligas abolished. All leagues from the Bezirksligas onwards were elevated one tier.

↑ Promoted	↓ Relegated
