= Claudio Roberto =

Brazilian football manager

Personal information
- Full name: Claudio Roberto Silveira
- Place of birth: Brazil

Managerial career
- Years: Team
- 2013-2014: Sri Lanka

Claudio Roberto is a Brazilian football manager who now works as head coach of Costa Rica Esporte Clube in his home country.

== Career ==
Roberto started his managerial career with Conilon Futebol Clube de Jaguaré. In 2013, he was appointed head coach of the Sri Lanka national football team, a position he held until 2014. After that, he coached Sete de Setembro Esporte Clube, Clube Esportivo Nova Esperança, Corumbaense Futebol Clube, C.D. Monte Carlo, Zhaoqing Lixun, Vitória Futebol Clube, Al-Nojoom, and Costa Rica Esporte Clube.

Roberto has managed Abu Dhabi club Sport Support Club for the first half of the 2021–22 season of the UAE Second Division League, but is being prevented from terminating his own contract and leaving the country by the club's chairman, Mahmoud Alkmash, who had attempted to hire him as a sales supervisor; despite Roberto not accepting to sign such a contract due to it not corresponding to his role in the club, Alkmash has been using it in order to keep the manager under his heel, only allowing him to break his contract provided he pays a release fee of approximately US$20,000, even though Roberto had not received any payment for his work.
