= ASV Zirndorf =

German football club

- Full name: Allgemeiner Sportverein Zirndorf e. V.
- Founded: 16 April 1946
- Ground: Willy-Knapp-Sportanlage
- Chairman: Lothar Konrad
- Manager: Martin Hermann
- League: Bezirksliga Mittelfranken 1 (VII)
- 2015–16: 2nd
Home colours	Away colours

The ASV Zirndorf is a German association football club from Zirndorf, suburb of the city of Nuremberg, Bavaria. Apart from football the club also offers other sports like table tennis and handball. The club's most successful era was in the 1960s when it spent four seasons in the tier three Bayernliga.

== History ==
ASV Zirndorf was formed on 16 April 1946 when five local clubs, TSV 1861 Zirndorf, 1. FC Zirndorf, SpVgg Zindorf, Arbeiter Turn- und Sportverein Jahn and Radfahrverein Solidarität merged. In the early days, the club used the facilities of TSV 1861 but they became a separate club again in August 1948 forcing ASV to move to the former facilities of 1. FC.

ASV Zirndorf was promoted to the northern division of the Bayernliga in 1962 after a title in the 2. Amateurliga Mittelfranken. The club played an impressive first season in this league, finishing runners-up to champions 1. FC Bamberg. Having finished in the top seven they also qualified for the new single division Bayernliga which was introduced at the end of the 1962–63 season.

Zirndorf played the next three seasons in this league, coming seventh in its first season. After this their results declined and in 1966 they were relegated after finishing sixteenth. In the Landesliga Bayern-Mitte, which was also introduced in 1963, the club continued to struggle and was relegated again after another sixteenth-place result, this time to the Bezirksliga. In 1972, ASV made a return to the Landesliga for three seasons but was relegated again in 1975. Eleven seasons of lower league football followed before Zirndorf made their way back to Landesliga play in 1986. The club's third stint in the league lasted for another three seasons in which it never finished higher than thirteenth.

Zirndorf entered the Bezirksoberliga Mittelfranken in 1989, a year after the league was formed. Over the next five seasons here the club struggled until again being sent dow to the Bezirksliga in 1995. They bounced back two seasons later and enjoyed five much more successful Bezirksoberliga seasons from 1996 onwards, culminating in a runners-up finish and promotion in 2001.

Back in the Landesliga for a fourth time, after an absence of twelve seasons, ASV spent another four seasons at this level. The first two seasons were promising, with a sixth and a seventh-place finish, but then results declined and the club was relegated again in 2005 after coming seventeenth. True to the clubs yo-yo nature it was relegated from the Bezirksoberliga in the following season, too. Four seasons in the Bezirksliga followed before ASV made another return to the Bezirksoberliga in 2010. They spent the two seasons in the Bezirksoberliga before that circuit was disbanded in 2012.

An eight place finish in the final Bezirksoberliga season was enough for the club to qualify for the new Landesliga Bayern-Nordost after the Landesliga had been expanded from three to five divisions, but Zirndorf finished their campaign in eighteenth place and was again sent down to the Bezirksliga.

Since 2013 the club has been playing in the Bezirksliga Mittelfranken 1.

== Honours ==
The club's honours:

=== League ===
- Bayernliga Nord
  - Runners-up: 1963
- 2. Amateurliga Mittelfranken
  - Champions: 1962
- Bezirksoberliga Mittelfranken
  - Runners-up: 2001
- Bezirksliga Mittelfranken-Nord
  - Champions: 1996
  - Runners-up: 2010, 2016
- Bezirksliga Mittelfranken-Süd
  - Champions: 1972
  - Runners-up: 1968, 1986

=== Cup ===
- Mittelfranken Cup
  - Winners: 2003

== Recent seasons ==
The recent season-by-season performance of the club:

Season	Division	Tier	Position
1999–2000	Bezirksoberliga Mittelfranken	VI	9th
2000–01	Bezirksoberliga Mittelfranken	VI	2nd ↑
2001–02	Landesliga Bayern-Mitte	V	7th
2002–03	Landesliga Bayern-Mitte	V	6th
2003–04	Landesliga Bayern-Mitte	V	10th
2004–05	Landesliga Bayern-Mitte	V	17th ↓
2005–06	Bezirksoberliga Mittelfranken	VI	13th ↓
2006–07	Bezirksliga Mittelfranken Nord	VII	5th
2007–08	Bezirksliga Mittelfranken Nord	VII	7th
2008–09	Bezirksliga Mittelfranken Nord	VIII	9th
2009–10	Bezirksliga Mittelfranken Nord	VIII	2nd ↑
2010–11	Bezirksoberliga Mittelfranken	VII	13th
2011–12	Bezirksoberliga Mittelfranken	VII	8th ↑
2012–13	Landesliga Bayern-Nordost	VI	18th ↓
2013–14	Bezirksliga Mittelfranken 1	VII	4th
2014–15	Bezirksliga Mittelfranken 1	VII	8th
2015–16	Bezirksliga Mittelfranken 1	VII	2nd
2016–17	Bezirksliga Mittelfranken 1	VII	

- With the introduction of the Bezirksoberligas in 1988 as the new fifth tier, below the Landesligas (IV), all leagues below dropped one tier. With the introduction of the Regionalligas (III) in 1994 and the 3. Liga in 2008 as the new third tier, below the 2. Bundesliga, all leagues below dropped one tier. With the establishment of the Regionalliga Bayern as the new fourth tier in Bavaria in 2012, the Bayernliga was split into a northern and a southern division, the number of Landesligas expanded from three to five and the Bezirksoberligas abolished. All leagues from the Bezirksligas onwards were elevated one tier.

=== Key ===
↑ Promoted	↓ Relegated
