= BSC Erlangen =

German football club

- Full name: Büchenbacher Sport Club Erlangen e.V.
- Founded: 2 December 1945
- Chairman: Josef Polster
- Manager: Heiko Schober
- League: Kreisklasse Elangen-Pegnitzgrund 1 (IX)
- 2018–19: A-Klasse Erlangen/Pegnitzgrund (X), 1st
| Home colours | Away colours |

The BSC Erlangen is a German association football club from the city of Erlangen, Bavaria. From 1957 to 1979, the club belonged to the Amateurliga Bayern, the highest football league in the state and then the third division of German football.

== History ==
The club traces its roots to SC Erlangen, founded in 1919 (exact date unknown). After the Second World War, on 2 September 1945, representatives of two other Büchenbach clubs Mannergesangverein Büchenbach and Radfahrverein Büchenbach agreed to merge with SC, thus SpVgg Büchenbach was born.

The club first rose to prominence in 1957, when it gained promotion to the Amateurliga Nordbayern (III), from the 2nd Amateurliga Mittelfranken.

Avoiding relegation narrowly in its first season, 1957–58, it became a fixture in the highest Bavarian football league for the next two decades, belonging to it for 22 seasons. The club established itself as a mid-table side and in 1961–62 took out the league title. This qualified the club for the German amateur football championship, where it got knocked out in the first round. The season after, a seventh place proved to be just enough to qualify for the now unified Bavarian Amateurliga which kicked off in 1963.

The first two seasons in the Bayernliga, the club had to play against relegation. After this, the SpVgg established itself in the upper half of the table. The club rose as far as to a third-place finish in 1969–70. From 1976, the club's fortunes started to decline and it gradually slipped to the end of the table. In 1978–79, now with the league renamed Amateur Oberliga Bayern, the club found itself relegated, finishing 16th out of 18 teams.

The club had been the last founding member of the league to have belonged to it without interruption. In the all-time table of the Bayernliga from 1963 to 2008, it still holds the 14th place out of 99 clubs.

Playing in the Landesliga Bayern-Mitte (IV) from 1979, the club struggled to establish itself in this league. In 1981, the SpVgg Büchenbach renamed itself to BSC Erlangen.

In the 1983–84 season, the club's fortunes improved somewhat, finishing fourth in the Landesliga. After this season, it rapidly declined and in 1986 a last-place finish meant relegation to the Bezirksliga (V).

In 1988, a Mittelfranken Cup win earned the club a place in the DFB Cup 1988–89, where it drew Bayer Leverkusen and lost 0–5 at home in the first round.

It took the BSC until 1991 to return to the Landesliga. It returned with much better results and came second in the league in 1992–93, which qualified the club for the promotion play-off to the Bayernliga, where they failed. The team remained a strong force in the league until 1995, when it slipped back to the lower half of the table. After battling relegation for a couple of seasons, the club finally was moved down in 1999–2000, now to the Bezirksoberliga Mittelfranken.

The season after proved disastrous for the club, with only one win and three draws out of 30 games, a last place finish and relegation were inevitable.

After this, the BSC has been moving up and down between Bezirksliga and Bezirksoberliga, playing in the later once more since 2008. At the end of the 2011–12 season the club dropped back to the Bezirksliga after finishing eleventh in the Bezirksoberliga but remained at the same tier as the Bezirksoberliga was disbanded.

The 2012–13 was a disastrous one for the club, winning only one game and conceding 214 goals. Consequently, BSC was relegated to the Kreisliga. The decline of the once proud amateur club results from a Euro 800,000 dept and the inability to pay its players. Before the 2012–13 season the entire first team left the club, forcing BSC to field its reserve side. In the final games of the season the club was at times only able to field seven players. The club withdrew its senior team in February 2014 from the Kreisliga with the future of BSC being very uncertain at the time. For the following season the club stepped down three tiers, entering the B-Klasse Erlangen/Pegnitzgrund 1, a league where 12 out of 15 teams were reserve sides but also included another former Bayernliga club, the ASV Herzogenaurach. After a runners-up finish the club was promoted to the A-Klasse.

== Honours ==
The club's honours:

=== League ===
- Amateurliga Nordbayern (III)
  - Champions: 1962
- 2nd Amateurliga Mittelfranken Nord (IV)
  - Champions: 1957
- Landesliga Bayern-Mitte (IV)
  - Runners-up: 1993
- Bezirksoberliga Mittelfranken (VI)
  - Champions: 1991
- Bezirksliga Mittelfranken-Nord (VII)
  - Champions: 2005, 2008

=== Cup ===
- Mittelfranken Cup
  - Winners: 1988

== Recent seasons ==
The recent season-by-season performance of the club:

| Season | Division | Tier | Position |
|---|---|---|---|
| 1999–2000 | Landesliga Bayern-Mitte | V | 17th ↓ |
| 2000–01 | Bezirksoberliga Mittelfranken | VI | 16th ↓ |
| 2001–02 | Bezirksliga Mittelfranken-Nord | VII | 12th |
| 2002–03 | Bezirksliga Mittelfranken-Nord | VII | 4th |
| 2003–04 | Bezirksliga Mittelfranken-Nord | VII | 8th |
| 2004–05 | Bezirksliga Mittelfranken-Nord | VII | 1st ↑ |
| 2005–06 | Bezirksoberliga Mittelfranken | VI | 14th ↓ |
| 2006–07 | Bezirksliga Mittelfranken-Nord | VII | 7th |
| 2007–08 | Bezirksliga Mittelfranken-Nord | VII | 1st ↑ |
| 2008–09 | Bezirksoberliga Mittelfranken | VII | 9th |
| 2009–10 | Bezirksoberliga Mittelfranken | VII | 9th |
| 2010–11 | Bezirksoberliga Mittelfranken | VII | 10th |
| 2011–12 | Bezirksoberliga Mittelfranken | VII | 11th |
| 2012–13 | Bezirksliga Mittelfranken-Nord | VII | 18th ↓ |
| 2013–14 | Kreisliga Erlangen/Pegnitzgrund | VIII | 16th ↓ |
| 2014–15 | B-Klasse Erlangen/Pegnitzgrund | XI | 2nd ↑ |
| 2015–16 | A-Klasse Erlangen/Pegnitzgrund | X | 13th |
| 2016–17 | A-Klasse Erlangen/Pegnitzgrund | X | 3rd |
| 2017–18 | A-Klasse Erlangen/Pegnitzgrund | X | 9th |
| 2018–19 | A-Klasse Erlangen/Pegnitzgrund | X | 1st ↑ |

- With the introduction of the Bezirksoberligas in 1988 as the new fifth tier, below the Landesligas, all leagues below dropped one tier. With the introduction of the Regionalligas in 1994 and the 3. Liga in 2008 as the new third tier, below the 2. Bundesliga, all leagues below dropped one tier. With the establishment of the Regionalliga Bayern as the new fourth tier in Bavaria in 2012 the Bayernliga was split into a northern and a southern division, the number of Landesligas expanded from three to five and the Bezirksoberligas abolished. All leagues from the Bezirksligas onwards were elevated one tier.

| ↑ Promoted | ↓ Relegated |

== DFB Cup appearances ==
The club has qualified for the first round of the German Cup just once:

| Season | Round | Date | Home | Away | Result | Attendance |
|---|---|---|---|---|---|---|
| DFB Cup 1988–89 | First round | 6 August 1988 | BSC Erlangen | Bayer Leverkusen | 0–5 | |
