= Mohamed Hassan Roomy =

Sri Lankan footballer

Personal information
- Full name: Mohamed Hassan Roomy Nizam Sheriff
- Place of birth: Sri Lanka

International career
Years	Team	Apps	(Gls)
- Sri Lanka

Managerial career
- Colombo FC
- 2022: Sri Lanka
- 2024–: Sri Lanka (women)

Mohamed Hassan Roomy Nizam Sheriff (මොහොමඩ් හසන් රූමි) is a Sri Lankan football manager and former player who manages the Sri Lanka women's national team.

== Career ==
As a player, Roomy played for the Sri Lanka national team. After retiring from playing football, he obtained the AFC A Coaching License. In 2010, he was appointed manager of Colombo FC in 2010, helping the club win the 2015 Sri Lanka FA Cup and the league three times. In 2022, he was appointed manager of the Sri Lanka national team, where he managed the team for 2023 AFC Asian Cup qualification. During the third round, they finished last place in their group so were unable to achieve qualification for the tournament.

Following his stint there, Roomy was appointed manager of the Sri Lanka women's national team in 2024. Upon managing the team, Sri Lankan newspaper Ceylon Today described him as a "well-known figure in football circles and had an illustrious career, vast coaching experience and renowned in Sri Lankan football circles... recognised for his strategic prowess and knack for player development".
