= FC Järfälla =

Swedish football club

- Full name: Fotbolls Club Järfälla
- Founded: 1993
- Ground: Järfällavallen; Järfälla; Sweden
- Chairman: Serdar Saygieder
- Head coach: Christian Campos
- League: Ettan Norra
Home colours	Away colours

FC Järfälla is a Swedish football club located in Järfälla.

== Background ==
FC Järfälla currently plays in Division 2 Norra Svealand which is the third tier of Swedish football. They play their home matches at the Järfällavallen in Järfälla.

The club is affiliated to Stockholms Fotbollförbund.

== Players ==
=== First-team squad ===
Note: Flags indicate national team as defined under FIFA eligibility rules; some limited exceptions apply. Players may hold more than one non-FIFA nationality.

No.	Pos.	Nation	Player
1	GK	NOR	Bernard Eide (on loan from Djurgården U19)
3	DF	SWE	Naram-Sin Akdemir
4	DF	SWE	Yusuf Aksoy
5	DF	SWE	Filip Nyberg
6	MF	SWE	Peter Saweris
7	FW	SWE	Chris Fox
8	FW	ETH	Nathnael Medhin
9	FW	SWE	Adam Würtz
10	MF	SWE	Anthony Portilla
11	MF	SWE	Ossian Ogestad
12	DF	MKD	Daniel Markovski
15	DF	SWE	Hannes Tinnborg
16	FW	SWE	Aria Sabery
17	FW	SYR	Abdulmannan Khalil
19	FW	DJI	Kahin Dahir

No.	Pos.	Nation	Player
20	MF	SWE	Emil Drugge Stals
21	MF	SRI	Adhavan Rajamohan
22	DF	SWE	Oscar Möller
23	FW	SWE	Cedrik Freado Danha
24	DF	SWE	Kenan Nišić
25	DF	SWE	Leonardo Bark (on loan from Västerås SK)
26	DF	SWE	Degome Dibaga
27	DF	SWE	Djoseph Bangala
28	MF	SWE	Abdirahim Abdulle (on loan from Djurgården)
29	MF	SWE	Adrian Hamidi
30	GK	SWE	Erik von Feilitzen
31	GK	SWE	Damian Kuranda
—	GK	SWE	Christos Liantas
—	DF	SWE	Muhammed Emir Taylan

== Season to season ==
Season	Level	Division	Section	Position	Movements
1993	Tier 5	Division 4	Stockholm Norra	1st	Promoted
1994	Tier 4	Division 3	Norra Svealand	6th	
1995	Tier 4	Division 3	Norra Svealand	10th	Relegated
1996	Tier 5	Division 4	Stockholm Norra	1st	Promoted
1997	Tier 4	Division 3	Norra Svealand	3rd	
1998	Tier 4	Division 3	Norra Svealand	1st	Promoted
1999	Tier 3	Division 2	Östra Svealand	8th	
2000	Tier 3	Division 2	Östra Svealand	12th	Relegated
2001	Tier 4	Division 3	Norra Svealand	10th	Relegation Playoffs – Relegated
2002	Tier 5	Division 4	Stockholm Norra	2nd	Promotion Playoffs
2003	Tier 5	Division 4	Stockholm Norra	6th	
2004	Tier 5	Division 4	Stockholm Norra	4th	
2005	Tier 5	Division 4	Stockholm Norra	2nd	Promotion Playoffs - Promoted
2006	Tier 5	Division 3	Norra Svealand	3rd	
2007	Tier 5	Division 3	Norra Svealand	6th	
2008	Tier 5	Division 3	Norra Svealand	3rd	
2009	Tier 5	Division 3	Norra Svealand	8th	
2010	Tier 5	Division 3	Norra Svealand	12th	Relegated
2011	Tier 6	Division 4	Stockholm Norra	7th	
2012	Tier 6	Division 4	Stockholm Norra	10th	
2013	Tier 6	Division 4	Stockholm Norra	12th	Relegated
2014	Tier 7	Division 5	Stockholm Norra	10th	
2015	Tier 7	Division 5	Stockholm Norra	2nd	
2016	Tier 7	Division 5	Stockholm Norra	1st	Promoted
2017	Tier 6	Division 4	Stockholm Norra	3rd	
2018	Tier 6	Division 4	Stockholm Norra	3rd	
2019	Tier 6	Division 4	Stockholm Norra	1st	Promoted
2020	Tier 5	Division 3	Norra Svealand	1st	Promoted
2021	Tier 4	Division 2	Norra Svealand	7th	
2022	Tier 4	Division 2	Norra Svealand	6th	
2023	Tier 4	Division 2	Norra Svealand	3rd	
2024	Tier 4	Division 2	Norra Svealand	5th	
2025	Tier 4	Division 2	Norra Svealand	1st	Promoted
