= Bezirksliga Mittelfranken 1 =

- Founded: 1963
- Country: Germany
- State: Bavaria
- Number of clubs: 16
- Level on pyramid: Level 7
- Promotion to: Landesliga
- Relegation to: Kreisliga Erlangen/Pegnitzgrund 1; Kreisliga Erlangen/Pegnitzgrund 2; Kreisliga Nürnberg/Frankenhöhe 2
- Current champions: Türkspor/Cagrispor Nürnberg (2019–21)

The Bezirksliga Mittelfranken 1 (English: District league Middle Franconia 1), formerly the Bezirksliga Mittelfranken Nord, is currently the seventh tier of the German football league system in the northern part of the Bavarian Regierungsbezirk of Middle Franconia (German: Mittelfranken). Until the disbanding of the Bezirksoberliga Mittelfranken in 2012 it was the eighth tier. From 2008, when the 3. Liga was introduced, it was the seventh tier of the league system, until the introduction of the Regionalligas in 1994 the sixth tier. From the league's inception in 1963 to the introduction of the Bezirksoberliga in 1988 it was the fifth tier.

== Overview ==
=== History ===
Before the Bezirksoberligas in Bavaria were introduced in 1988 the Bezirksligas were the leagues set right below the Landesligas Bayern in the football pyramid from 1963 onwards, when the Landesligas and Bezirksligas were established. Until the establishment of the Bezirksoberliga, the league champions were not automatically promoted but instead had to play-off for promotion as there was six Bezirksligas feeding the Landesliga Mitte, two each in Middle Franconia, Upper Palatinate and Lower Bavaria.

In 1988, when the Bezirksoberligas were introduced, the league lost some of its status as it was relegated one tier. On a positive note, the league champions were now always promoted and the league runners-up had the opportunity to play-off for promotion as well. After the 2010–11 season the league's name was changed from the geographical distinction Nord to a number, becoming the Bezirksliga Mittelfranken 1.

With the league reform at the end of the 2011–12 season, which included an expansion of the number of Landesligas from three to five, the Bezirksoberligas were disbanded. Instead, the Bezirksligas took the place of the Bezirksoberligas once more below the Landesligas.

=== Format ===
The winner of the Bezirksliga Mittelfranken-Nord, like the winner of the Bezirksliga Mittelfranken-Süd was, until 2011, directly promoted to the Bezirksoberliga Mittelfranken. The runners-up of the Bezirksligas in Middle Franconia would take part in a promotion round with the best-placed Bezirksoberliga team which did finish on a relegation rank to determine one or more additional promotion spots, depending on availability. From the 2012–13 season onwards, the league champion will be promoted to one of the Landesligas, depending on geographic location.

The bottom three teams of each group are relegated to one of the Kreisligas. At the same time the Kreisliga champions were promoted to the Bezirksliga. The runners-up of the Kreisligas faced a play-off with each other and the 13th placed teams in the Bezirksliga.

The Bezirksliga Mittelfranken 1 is fed by the following Kreisligas:

- Kreisliga Erlangen/Pegnitzgrund 1
- Kreisliga Erlangen/Pegnitzgrund 2
- Kreisliga Nürnberg/Frankenhöhe 2

From 1995, the league was generally operated with a strength of 16 clubs and rarely deviated from this until 2012, when the number was increased to 18. In 2019, it was decreased back to 16.

=== League timeline ===
The league went through the following timeline of positions in the league system:

Years	Name	Tier	Promotion to
1963–88	Bezirksliga Mittelfranken-Nord	V	Landesliga Bayern-Mitte
1988–94	Bezirksliga Mittelfranken-Nord	VI	Bezirksoberliga Mittelfranken
1994–2008	Bezirksliga Mittelfranken-Nord	VII	Bezirksoberliga Mittelfranken
2008–12	Bezirksliga Mittelfranken-Nord	VIII	Bezirksoberliga Mittelfranken
2012–	Bezirksliga Mittelfranken 1	VII	Landesligas Bayern

== League champions ==
The winners and runners–up of the league:

=== 1963–1988 ===
The league champions and runners–up while being a feeder league to the Landesliga:

**Season**	**Champions**	**Runners–up**
1963–64	**SpVgg Jahn Forchheim**	1. FC Schnaittach
1964–65	**TV 1848 Erlangen**	
1965–66	**1. FC Herzogenaurach**	
1966–67	**1. SC Feucht**	
1967–68	**ASV Herzogenaurach**	TSV Burgfarrnbach
1968–69	**ASV Neumarkt** ^{+}	TSV Röthenbach ^{+}
1969–70	TSV Röthenbach	TSV Wilhermsdorf
1970–71	**SpVgg Jahn Forchheim**	FSV Erlangen-Bruck
1971–72	**TSV Langenzenn**	SC Adelsdorf
1972–73	TSV Höchstadt	TSV Röttenbach
1973–74	SC Adelsdorf	**ATSV Erlangen**
1974–75	TSV Höchstadt	1. FC Schnaittach
1975–76	**SpVgg Erlangen**	TSV Höchstadt
1976–77	SC Pommelsbrunn	TSV Röttenbach
1977–78	**TSV Röttenbach**	TSV Röthenbach an der Pegnitz
1978–79	**SpVgg Jahn Forchheim**	TSV Neunkirchen am Brand
1979–80	**TSV Vestenbergsgreuth**	SK Lauf
1980–81	**SK Lauf**	TSV Neunkirchen am Brand
1981–82	TSV Langenzenn	ASV Pegnitz
1982–83	**SV Ermreuth**	ASV Forth 1888
1983–84	**1. FC Herzogenaurach**	ASV Neumarkt
1984–85	FV Wendelstein	TSV Röttenbach/Erlangen
1985–86	**SpVgg Jahn Forchheim**	1. FC Herzogenaurach
1986–87	**1. FC Herzogenaurach**	ASV Neumarkt
1987–88	**TSV Ebermannstadt**	**ASV Neumarkt**

=== 1988–2012 ===
The league champions and runners–up while being a feeder league to the Bezirksoberliga:

**Season**	Champions	**Runners–up**
1988–89	1. FC Hersbruck	FV Wendelstein
1989–90	SK Lauf	**SpVgg Erlangen**
1990–91	FV Wendelstein	**SV Pölling**
1991–92	SpVgg Heßdorf	TSV Röttenbach ^{+}
1992–93	DJK Langwasser	SV 73 Nürnberg–Süd
1993–94	FC Stein	**SpVgg Fürth II**
1994–95	TSV Ebermannstadt	**SK Lauf**
1995–96	ASV Zirndorf	**FSV Erlangen–Bruck**
1996–97	TSV Neunkirchen	**SV 73 Nürnberg–Süd**
1997–98	ASV Forth	**SG Quelle Fürth II**
1998–99	SC Eltersdorf	**TSV SWS Nürnberg**
1999–2000	ASV Vach II	**1. FC Schnaittach**
2000–01	1. FC Burk	**TSV SWS Nürnberg**
2001–02	SG 83 Nürnberg-Fürth	**SV 73 Nürnberg-Süd**
2002–03	SpVgg Jahn Forchheim	SV Buckenhofen
2003–04	Post SV Nürnberg	**SpVgg Heßdorf**
2004–05	BSC Erlangen	1. FC Hersbruck
2005–06	SV Buckenhofen	1. FC Hersbruck
2006–07	1. FC Hersbruck	**SK Lauf**
2007–08	BSC Erlangen	**FSV Erlangen-Bruck II**
2008–09	Baiersdorfer SV	SpVgg Erlangen
2009–10	Dergahspor Nürnberg	**ASV Zirndorf**
2010–11	ASV Vach	TSV Buch
2011–12	ASV Pegnitz	FC Stein

=== 2012–present ===
The league champions and runners–up while being a feeder league to the Landesliga once more:

**Season**	Champions	**Runners–up**
2012–13	ASV Veitsbronn-Sieg.	SpVgg Erlangen
2013–14	BSV Baiersdorf	SV Schwaig
2014–15	TSV Kornburg	SpVgg Erlangen
2015–16	ATSV Erlangen	ASV Zirndorf
2016–17	SpVgg Erlangen	SG 1883 Nürnberg/Fürth
2017–18	1. FC Herzogenaurach	1. FC Hersbruck
2018–19	SV Schwaig	**FSV Stadeln**
2019–21	Türkspor/Cagrispor Nürnberg	SVG Steinachgrund

- Promoted teams in **bold**.
- ^{+} Teams finished on equal points, decider needed to determine final position.
- In 2008 third placed FSV Stadeln was also promoted.
- In 2020 the season was suspended and later extended to 2021, when the champion and the runner-up were ranked on a points per game basis.

== Current clubs ==
The clubs in the league in the 2021–22 season and their 2019–21 final positions:

Club	Position
Baiersdorfer SV	Relegated from the Landesliga
SV Gutenstetten-Steinachgrund	2nd
SC Adelsdorf	3rd
SpVgg Hüttenbach	4th
SV Buckenhofen	5th
ASV Weisendorf	6th
1. FC Kalchreuth	7th
ASV Veitsbronn-Siegelsdorf	8th
SpVgg Erlangen	9th
1. FC Hersbruck	10th
SK Lauf	11th
TV 1848 Erlangen	12th
FC Ottensoos	13th
SpVgg Diepersdorf	Promoted from the Kreisliga
SpVgg Mögeldorf	Promoted from the Kreisliga
DJK SC Oesdorf	Promoted from the Kreisliga
