= Niloshan Senthurvasan =

Sri Lankan footballer (born 2002)

Personal information
- Full name: Niloshan Senthurvasan
- Date of birth: 10 March 2002 (age 24)
- Place of birth: Oslo, Norway
- Height: 1.78 m (5 ft 10 in)
- Position: Midfielder

Team information
- Current team: Lillehammer FK
- Number: 4

Youth career
- –2016: Abildsø IL
- 2017–2021: KFUM-Kameratene Oslo

Senior career*
Years	Team	Apps	(Gls)
2019–2021	KFUM-Kameratene Oslo 2	10	(2)
2021	Nordstrand IF	1	(0)
2022–2024	Ås IL	21	(12)
2025	Drøbak-Frogn IL 2	2	(0)
2025–2026	Drøbak-Frogn IL	29	(3)
2026–	Lillehammer FK	2	(0)

International career^{‡}
2025–	Sri Lanka	9	(2)
- * Club domestic league appearances and goals as of 05 September 2026 ‡ National team caps and goals as of 5 October 2026

Niloshan Senthurvasan (Tamil: நிலோஷன் செந்துர்வசன்; born 10 March 2002) is a professional footballer who plays as a midfielder for Norwegian Third Division club Lillehammer FK. Born in Norway, he represents the Sri Lanka national team.

== Early life ==
Senthurvasan was born in Oslo, Norway, to Sri Lankan Tamil parents. He speaks Tamil fluently.

== Club career ==
Senthurvasan began his youth career at Abildsø IL before moving to KFUM-Kameratene Oslo in 2017. He progressed through the youth and reserve teams, including KFUM 2, where he made 10 league appearances and scored 2 goals.

In 2021, he briefly played for Nordstrand IF, making 1 league appearance. He then joined Ås for the 2022–2024 seasons, scoring 12 goals in 21 league appearances.

In 2025, he signed for Drøbak-Frogn IL, making 15 league appearances and scoring 1 goal. He also appeared twice for Drøbak-Frogn 2 in the same year.

== International career ==
Senthurvasan received his first call-up to the Sri Lanka national football team in September 2025. He made his debut against the Maldives, playing 21 minutes, and earned his second cap in the return fixture three days later.

He scored his first international goal on 31 March 2026 against Chinese Taipei during the 2027 AFC Asian Cup qualification at the Taipei Municipal Stadium.

== Career statistics ==
=== Club ===
Season	Club	Division	Apps	Goals
2019–2021	KFUM Oslo 2	4. divisjon	10	2
2021	Nordstrand	3. divisjon	1	0
2022–2024	Ås IL	4. divisjon	21	12
2025	Drøbak-Frogn 2	5. divisjon	2	0
2025	Drøbak-Frogn	3. divisjon	15	1

=== International ===
As of match played 5 October 2026

Appearances and goals by national team and year
National team	Year	Apps	Goals
Sri Lanka	2025	5	0
Sri Lanka	2026	4	2
Total		9	2

Scores and results list Sri Lanka's goal tally first, score column indicates score after each Senthurvasan goal

List of international goals scored by Niloshan Senthurvasan
No.	Date	Venue	Opponent	Score	Result	Competition
1	31 March 2026	Taipei Municipal Stadium, Taipei, Taiwan	Chinese Taipei	2–0	3–1	2027 AFC Asian Cup qualification
2	5 October 2026	Côte d'Or National Sports Complex, Saint Pierre, Mauritius	Mauritius	2–1	3–2	Friendly
