= Geremi Perera =

Sri Lankan footballer (born 2004)

Personal information
- Full name: Geremi Perera
- Date of birth: 25 May 2004 (age 22)
- Place of birth: Uehlfeld, Germany
- Height: 1.83 m (6 ft 0 in)
- Position: Midfielder

Team information
- Current team: SC Eltersdorf
- Number: 5

Youth career
- 2019–2022: Würzburger Kickers

Senior career*
Years	Team	Apps	(Gls)
2022–2023	Würzburger Kickers	0	(0)
2024–2025	ATSV Erlangen	69	(23)
2025–	SC Eltersdorf	28	(8)

International career^{‡}
2025–	Sri Lanka	1	(0)
- * Club domestic league appearances and goals as of 27 September 2026 ‡ National team caps and goals as of 9 October 2025

Geremi Perera (born 25 March 2004) is a footballer who plays as a midfielder for Regionalliga Bayern club SC Eltersdorf. Born in Germany, he plays for the Sri Lanka national team.

== Club career ==
=== Early career ===
A Uehlfeld native, Perera began playing for his hometown club, SpVgg Uehlfeld, before moving to SpVgg Greuther Fürth at the age of nine. In 2019, he joined the youth set-up of Würzburger Kickers playing in both U16 and U19 level, and also vice-captained the U19 team in 2021, during which he scored two goals in 15 matches.

=== Würzburger Kickers ===
On 1 July 2022, he signed his first professional contract with Würzburger Kickers after spending four years with the club's youth team.

=== ATSV Erlangen ===
In July 2023, after failing to make a single appearance for the senior team of Würzburger Kickers, Perera joined Bayernliga Nord club ATSV Erlangen.

== International career ==
In January 2025, Perera confirmed his availability to join the Sri Lanka national football team.

In March 2025, he was eventually included in the national squad for the 2027 AFC Asian Cup qualification – third round. However, he dropped out of the team due to an injury.

== Career statistics ==
=== International ===
As of 9 October 2025

Appearances and goals by national team and year
National team	Year	Apps	Goals
Sri Lanka	2025	1	0
Total		1	0
