= Abdullah Al Mutairi =

Kuwaiti football manager

Personal information
- Full name: Abdullah Al Mutairi
- Date of birth: 18 December 1981 (age 44)
- Place of birth: Kuwait

Managerial career
- Years: Team
- 2015–2016: Radwa
- 2016: Qaryah Al-Ulya
- 2017: Kyrgyzstan U13
- 2017: Kyrgyzstan U17
- 2021–2022: Nepal
- 2023: Afghanistan
- 2023–2024: Al-Jahra
- 2024–2026: Sri Lanka
- 2026–: Sri Lanka
Medal record
Men's football
Representing Nepal (as Manager)
SAFF Championship
Runner-up	2021 Maldives

Abdullah Al Mutairi is a Kuwaiti professional football manager who is currently the head coach of the Sri Lanka national team.

He has also managed the Kyrgyzstan national under-17 team and was also the head coach of the Nepal national team for the 2022 FIFA World Cup qualifiers.

== Career ==
=== Early career ===
Al-Mutairi coached youth teams around Kuwait, most notably Qadsia. In 2015, he moved to train teams in Saudi Arabia like Radwa and Qaryah Al-Ulya. On 18 December 2020, Al-Mutairi got his AFC Pro Licence from the Qatar Football Association.

=== Nepal ===
On 4 April 2021, Al-Mutairi was appointed as the head coach of the Nepal national team by the All Nepal Football Association.

On 25 July 2021, Al-Mutairi announced his intention to resign via social media, citing internal disputes and politics within ANFA and disagreements with senior officials. However, he continued in the role and later agreed to a contract extension after the 2021 SAFF Championship.

In October 2021, he led Nepal to their first-ever final in the SAFF Championship, where they lost 3–0 to India. Following the tournament, he agreed to a three-year contract extension with ANFA.

Throughout his tenure, there were ongoing tensions and controversies involving internal disputes with ANFA officials and senior players.

Al-Mutairi officially resigned as head coach on 11 September 2022, announcing the end of his tenure on social media. His departure followed prolonged disputes and a period of leave due to health reasons and was succeeded by Pradip Humagain as interim coach.

=== Afghanistan ===
On 26 April 2023, Al-Mutairi was appointed as head coach of the Afghanistan national team. His first with Afghanistan ended with chaos when he ordered his team leave the field after Kyrgyzstan scored in the 97th minute during the 2023 CAFA Nations Cup. On 16 June, Afghanistan lost 6–1 against Iran resulting in Al-Mutairi's team finishing last in the group.

His erratic behaviour continued in a friendly match against Bangladesh in Dhaka on 7 September 2023, when he was sent off after a scuffle with Bangladesh assistant coach Hassan Al-Mamun.

Al-Mutairi was sacked by the Afghanistan Football Federation in October 2023 following ongoing conflicts with players and internal disputes over team management and coaching methods. Several senior players had publicly complained to the federation and refused to accept him as head coach. His dismissal followed incidents such as refusing to sign the match sheet for a 2026 FIFA World Cup qualifier against Mongolia.

=== Sri Lanka ===
On 20 August 2024, Al-Mutairi was appointed as the interim head coach of the Sri Lanka national team for 2027 AFC Asian Cup qualification play-off matches against Cambodia.

Al-Mutairi stepped down as head coach of Sri Lanka on 22 January 2026 by mutual agreement.

== Managerial statistics ==
As of match played 18 October 2023

Managerial record by team and tenure
Team	From	To	Record					Ref.
Team	From	To	P	W	D	L	Win %	Ref.
Nepal	4 April 2021	11 September 2022	19	5	2	12	26.3	
Afghanistan	26 April 2023	20 October 2023	7	2	2	3	28.6	
Total			26	7	4	15	26.9	—
