= Oleksandr Churilov =

Ukrainian footballer (born 1984)

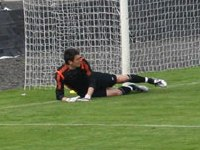

Personal information
- Full name: Oleksandr Volodymyrovych Churilov
- Date of birth: 6 June 1984 (age 42)
- Place of birth: Zhdanov, Donetsk Oblast, Ukrainian SSR
- Height: 1.89 m (6 ft 2 1/2 in)
- Position: Goalkeeper

Team information
- Current team: SC Eltersdorf
- Number: 25

Youth career
- 1998–2000: FC Metalurh Mariupol
- 2000–2001: FC Shakhtar Donetsk

Senior career*
Years	Team	Apps	(Gls)
2001–2002	FC Mashynobudivnyk Druzhkivka	1	(0)
2003	FC Pivdenstal Yenakiyeve	3	(0)
2004	FC Uholyok Dymytrov	2	(0)
2004	FC Ihroservice Simferopol	2	(0)
2006–2007	FC Olimpik Donetsk	29	(0)
2008	FC Feniks-Illichovets Kalinine	16	(0)
2009	FC Dacia Chișinău	2	(0)
2009	FC Zorya Luhansk	0	(0)
2010	FC Zirka Kirovohrad	16	(0)
2010–2011	FC Bukovyna Chernivtsi	32	(0)
2012	FC Tytan Armyansk	4	(0)
2012–2013	FC Naftovyk-Ukrnafta Okhtyrka	27	(0)
2013	FC Hoverla Uzhhorod	4	(0)
2014–2016	FC Illichivets Mariupol	5	(0)
2016	FC Ternopil	3	(0)
2017–2022	FC Coburg	43	(0)
2022–	SC Eltersdorf	41	(0)
- * Club domestic league appearances and goals as of 27 September 2026

Oleksandr Churilov (Ukrainian: Олександр Володимирович Чурілов; born 6 June 1984) is a professional Ukrainian football goalkeeper who plays for German club SC Eltersdorf.

== Career ==
Churilov is a product of the youth team systems of Metalurh Mariupol and FC Shakhtar Donetsk. His first trainer was Volodymyr Kolach. He signed a contract with FC Illichivets in January 2014.
