= Kuwaiti =

Kuwaiti may refer to:

- Something of, from, or related to the country of Kuwait
- A person from Kuwait, or of Kuwaiti descent, see Demographics of Kuwait
- Kuwaiti Arabic, the dialect of Gulf Arabic spoken in Kuwait
- Kuwaiti Persian, a dialect of Persian spoken in Kuwait
- Kuwaiti cuisine
- Kuwaiti culture

== See also ==
- List of Kuwaitis
- Languages of Kuwait
