= Jude Supan =

Sri Lankan footballer

Personal information
- Full name: Jude Supan Sebamalalainayakam
- Date of birth: 30 July 1998 (age 28)
- Place of birth: Sri Lanka
- Height: 1.80 m (5 ft 11 in)
- Position: Defender

Team information
- Current team: Renown SC

Senior career*
Years	Team	Apps	(Gls)
2018–	Renown SC		

International career^{‡}
2018–	Sri Lanka	30	(0)
- * Club domestic league appearances and goals as of 11:01, 13 September 2021 (UTC) ‡ National team caps and goals as of 11:01, 30 July 2026 (UTC)

Jude Supan Sebamalalainayakam (born 30 July 1998) is a Sri Lankan international footballer who plays as a defender for Renown SC in the Sri Lanka Football Premier League.

== Career statistics ==
=== International ===
As of match played 3 July 2026

Appearances and goals by national team and year
National team	Year	Apps	Goals
Sri Lanka	2018	1	0
Sri Lanka	2019	9	0
Sri Lanka	2020	2	0
Sri Lanka	2021	9	1
Sri Lanka	2022	–	
Sri Lanka	2023	2	0
Sri Lanka	2024	6	0
Sri Lanka	2025	–	
Sri Lanka	2026	1	0
Total		30	0
