= Ngawang Jamphel =

Bhutanese footballer

Personal information
- Date of birth: 27 September 1992 (age 34)
- Place of birth: Bhutan
- Position: Goalkeeper

Senior career*
Years	Team	Apps	(Gls)
2018–2024	Thimphu City F.C.		

International career
2018–2026	Bhutan		
- * Club domestic league appearances and goals

Ngawang Jamphel (born 27 September 1992) is a Bhutanese professional footballer. He has also played for the Bhutan national football team.

== Career ==
=== International ===
Jamphel made his senior international debut on 1 April 2018, coming on as a halftime substitute in a 7–0 friendly defeat to Malaysia. He was included in the Bhutan squad for the 2018 SAFF Championship, making the third-most saves in the tournament despite only playing two matches.

== Career statistics ==
=== International ===
As of matches played 3 October 2019

National team	Year	Apps	Goals
Bhutan	2018	3	0
Bhutan	2019	2	0
