= Choki Wangchuk =

Bhutanese footballer

Personal information
- Full name: Choki Wangchuk
- Date of birth: 2 February 1998 (age 28)
- Place of birth: Chukha, Bhutan
- Height: 1.81 m (5 ft 11 1/2 in)
- Position: Defender

Team information
- Current team: Ugyen Academy F.C.
- Number: 3

Youth career
- 2014: Druk Star

Senior career*
Years	Team	Apps	(Gls)
2015–2018	Transport United	1	(3)
2018–	ARA	0	(0)

International career
2015–	Bhutan U19	3	(0)
2016–	Bhutan	2	(0)
- * Club domestic league appearances and goals

Choki Wangchuk is a Bhutanese professional footballer. He made his first appearance in their 2019 AFC Asian Cup qualifying match against Bangladesh, being named in the starting lineup and playing the whole game.

== Club career ==
=== ARA FC ===
On 1 December 2018, it was announced that Choki Wangchuk would go on to ARA FC, also of the I-League 2nd Division.
