= Harsha Fernando =

Sri Lankan footballer

Personal information
- Full name: Niculas Harsha Fernando Kurukulasuriya
- Date of birth: 21 November 1992 (age 33)
- Place of birth: Sri Lanka
- Position: Defender

Senior career*
Years	Team	Apps	(Gls)
2014–2025	Air Force		

International career^{‡}
2018–2025	Sri Lanka	37	(0)
- * Club domestic league appearances and goals as of 16:46, 10 September 2021 (UTC) ‡ National team caps and goals as of 17:30, 9 September 2025 (UTC)

Niculas Harsha Fernando Kurukulasuriya (born 21 November 1992) is a Sri Lankan retired professional footballer who played as a defender.
