= Kencho Tobgay =

Bhutanese footballer (born 1991)

Personal information
- Full name: Kencho Tobgay
- Date of birth: 11 October 1991 (age 35)
- Place of birth: Thimphu, Bhutan
- Height: 1.73 m (5 ft 8 in)
- Position: Forward

Senior career*
Years	Team	Apps	(Gls)
2015	Yeedzin F.C.		
2016–2018	Transport United FC		
2018–2020	Paro FC		
2020–2024	Thimphu City FC		
2026	Drukpa FC		

International career
2017–	Bhutan	5	(0)
- * Club domestic league appearances and goals

Kencho Tobgay (born 11 October 1991) is a Bhutanese professional footballer. He made his first appearance for the Bhutan national football team in 2017.
