= Asela Madushan =

Sri Lankan footballer

Personal information
- Full name: Jayakody Arachchige Asela Madushan
- Date of birth: 9 December 1999 (age 26)
- Position: Forward

Team information
- Current team: Renown

Youth career
- –2017: Saint Joseph's College

Senior career*
Years	Team	Apps	(Gls)
2018–	Renown		

International career^{‡}
2018–	Sri Lanka	4	(1)
- * Club domestic league appearances and goals as of 11:44, 9 December 2018 (UTC) ‡ National team caps and goals as of 11:44, 9 December 2018 (UTC)

Jayakody Arachchige Asela Madushan (born 9 December 1999), commonly known as Asela Madushan, is a Sri Lankan footballer who currently plays as a forward for Renown.

== Career statistics ==
=== International ===
As of matches played 9 December 2018.

National team	Year	Apps	Goals
Sri Lanka	2018	4	1
Total		4	1

=== International goals ===
Scores and results list Sri Lanka's goal tally first.

No	Date	Venue	Opponent	Score	Result	Competition
1.	12 October 2018	Sugathadasa Stadium, Colombo, Sri Lanka	Malaysia	1–0	1–4	Friendly
