= Football Federation of Sri Lanka =

Governing body of Association football in Sri Lanka

AFC
- Short name: FFSL
- Founded: 7 January 1939; 87 years ago (as Ceylon Football Association); 1972; 54 years ago (as Football Federation of Sri Lanka)
- Headquarters: 100/9 Independence Avenue 07 - Colombo, Sri Lanka
- FIFA affiliation: 1952; 74 years ago
- AFC affiliation: 1954; 72 years ago
- SAFF affiliation: 1997; 29 years ago
- President: Jaswar Umar
- Website: football.lk

The Football Federation of Sri Lanka (FFSL), also known as Football Sri Lanka (FSL), is the governing body of football in Sri Lanka. It operates the Sri Lanka national football team and Sri Lanka Football Premier League.

== History ==
FFSL was founded on 1939 as Ceylon Football Association, later rechristened as Football Federation of Sri Lanka in 1972. FSL affiliated with FIFA in 1952. FFSL affiliated with Asian Football Confederation in 1954 and was the founding member of South Asian Football Federation which was founded in 1997. In 2014, at the 75th anniversary of FFSL, FIFA President Sepp Blatter visited Sri Lanka and opened a new football stadium in Jaffna. During the visit, Blatter said he was not pleased with the development of Football in Sri Lanka and that the authorities haven't taken enough steps to support football on the island. The AFC President Sheikh Salman Bin Ibrahim Al Khalifa also joined the visit. In 2021, the organisation introduced a new logo and adopted a new brand name.

=== 2023: FIFA suspension ===
FIFA suspended the FFSL from 21 January 2023 until further notice. Therefore, all teams/clubs affiliated with the FFSL are no longer entitled to take part in international competitions. The suspension was lifted on 29 August 2023.

== National teams ==
=== Men ===
- Sri Lanka national football team
- Sri Lanka national under-23 football team
- Sri Lanka national under-20 football team
- Sri Lanka national under-17 football team
- Sri Lanka national beach soccer team

=== Women ===
- Sri Lanka women's national football team
- Sri Lanka women's national under-20 football team
- Sri Lanka women's national under-17 football team

== Corporate structure ==
Name	Position	Source
(Sri Lanka) Jaswar Umaru Lebbe	President	
(Sri Lanka) Antony Davidson	Vice President	
(Sri Lanka) N. T. Farook	2nd Vice President	
(Sri Lanka) Upali Hewage	3rd Vice President	
(Sri Lanka) Padmasiri Munasinghe	4th Vice President	
(Sri Lanka) Jaswar Umar Lebbe	General Secretary	
n/a	Treasurer	
(Bosnia and Herzegovina) Amir Alagić	Technical Director	
(Kuwait) Abdullah Al Mutairi	Team Coach (Men's)	
(Sri Lanka) Thilak Alponsu	Team Coach (Women's)	
(Sri Lanka) Ranjith Rodrigo	Media/Communications Manager	
(Sri Lanka) Saif Yusoof	Futsal Coordinator	
(Sri Lanka) Sankar Komaleeswaran	Referee Coordinator	

== Logo ==
Logo before 2021

Logo since 2021

== See also ==
- Football in Sri Lanka
