= 2023–24 Futsal Club Championship =

Third edition of Hero Futsal Club Championship

Tournament details
- Country: India
- City: Vadodara
- Venue(s): Swarnim Gujarat Sports University
- Dates: 22 June–5 July 2024
- Teams: 19

Final positions
- Champions: Corbett FC (1st title)
- Runners-up: Golazo FC

Tournament statistics
- Top goal scorer(s): PC Lalruatsanga

Awards
- Best player: Lalsangkima
- Best goalkeeper: Ozen Vivian Silva

The 2023–24 Futsal Club Championship was the 3rd edition of the Futsal Club Championship, an annual futsal club tournament in India, organised by the All India Football Federation (AIFF) and held in Vadodara.

== Format ==
The Futsal Club Championship 2023–24 features a total of 19 teams, who were divided into four groups, and play in a round-robin format. The semi-final stage is played in a knockout format between the top group stage teams.

== Teams ==
Locations of Futsal Club Championship teams
Group A
Group B
Group C
Group D

Team	State	City
Millat FC	Maharashtra	Mumbai
Sports Odisha	Odisha	Bhubaneshwar
Classic FA	Manipur	Imphal
Corbett FC	Uttarakhand	Rudrapur
Nyenshen FC	Nagaland	Tuensang
Electric Veng FC	Mizoram	Aizawl
Bangalore Arrows FC	Karnataka	Bengaluru
Satvir FC	Haryana	Rohtak
Goal Hunterz FC	Delhi	New Delhi
Minerva Academy FC	Punjab	Mohali
Baroda FA	Gujarat	Vadodara
FC Thrystior	Mizoram	Aizawl
Speed Force FC	Telangana	Hyderabad
Guwahati City FC	Assam	Guwahati
Ambelim SC	Goa	Ambelim
JCT FA	Punjab	Phagwara
Golazo FC	Himachal Pradesh	Hamirpur
Casa Barwani SC	Madhya Pradesh	Barwani
Delhi FC	Delhi	New Delhi

== Group stage ==
=== Group A ===
Pos	Team	Pld	W	D	L	GF	GA	GD	Pts	Qualification
1	Corbett FC	4	4	0	0	28	8	+20	12	Advanced to Knockout stage
2	Millat FC	4	3	0	1	22	15	+7	9	Advanced to Knockout stage
3	Classic FA	4	2	0	2	22	16	+6	6	
4	Nyenshen FC	4	1	0	3	13	25	−12	3	
5	Sports Odisha	4	0	0	4	7	28	−21	0	

Source: AIFF

=== Group B ===
Pos	Team	Pld	W	D	L	GF	GA	GD	Pts	Qualification
1	Minerva Academy FC	4	4	0	0	27	8	+19	12	Advanced to Knockout stage
2	Electric Veng FC	4	2	1	1	21	15	+6	7	Advanced to Knockout stage
3	Goal Hunterz	4	2	0	2	15	10	+5	6	
4	Bangalore Arrows FC	4	1	1	2	24	16	+8	4	
5	Satvir FC	4	0	0	4	6	44	−38	0	

Source: AIFF

=== Group C ===
Pos	Team	Pld	W	D	L	GF	GA	GD	Pts	Qualification
1	FC Thyrstior	4	3	0	1	25	10	+15	9	Advanced to Knockout stage
2	Ambelim SC	4	3	0	1	17	9	+8	9	Advanced to Knockout stage
3	Speed Force FC	4	3	0	1	18	21	−3	9	
4	Baroda FA	4	1	0	3	11	17	−6	3	
5	Guwahati City FC	4	0	0	4	10	24	−14	0	

Source: AIFF

=== Group D ===
Pos	Team	Pld	W	D	L	GF	GA	GD	Pts	Qualification
1	Golazo FC	3	3	0	0	26	2	+24	9	Advanced to Knockout stage
2	Delhi FC	3	2	0	1	17	17	0	6	Advanced to Knockout stage
3	JCT	3	1	0	2	10	9	+1	3	
4	Casa Barwani SC	3	0	0	3	4	29	−25	0	

Source: AIFF

== Knockout stage ==
=== Bracket ===
Quarter-finals
3 July
Corbett FC	11
Delhi FC	1
3 July
Minerva Academy FC	2
Ambelim SC	8
3 July
FC Thyrstior	6
Electric Veng FC	3
3 July
Golazo FC	8
Millat FC	0

Semi-finals
3 July
Corbett FC	6
Ambelim SC	5
3 July
FC Thyrstior	3
Golazo FC	5

Final
3 July
Corbett FC	3
Golazo FC	2

=== Quarter-finals ===
3 July 2024
11:00 IST

Corbett FC	11-1	Delhi FC
Aaron Dcosta 2', 5', 17'; Pratik Swami 8'; Lalbiakzuala 10', 15'; Pc Lalruatsanga 16', 19', 28', 29'; Malsawmtluanga Pautu 40'	Report	Kh Azlaan Shah 36'

Swarnim Gujarat Sports University

3 July 2024
14:00 IST

Minerva Academy FC	2-8	Ambelim SC
Thongkhongmayum Naoba 37'; Samson Keishing 40'	Report	Fredsan Marshall 6', 34'; Clive Miranda 13'; Michael Silva 17'; Ronaldo Rosebud Pereira 28', 29'; Lyndon Cardoso 30'; Fraizer Xavier Cardozo 33'

Swarnim Gujarat Sports University

3 July 2024
17:00 IST

FC Thyrstior	6-3	Electric Veng FC
C Lalrinhlua 5'; Laltluangzela 15', 38'; K Roluahpuia 32'; Peter Lalrinhlua 37'; Lalhmangaiha 40'	Report	Lalremtluanga 3', 10', 11'

Swarnim Gujarat Sports University

3 July 2024
20:00 IST

Golazo FC	8-0	Millat FC
Clinton Rosario D'souza 10', 12'; Sachin Patil 16', 18'; Stephen Satarkar 22', 22'; Lalsangkima 26'; Augustin Savio D'mello 38'	Report

Swarnim Gujarat Sports University

=== Semi-finals ===
5 July 2024
16:00 IST

Corbett FC	6-5	Ambelim SC
Pc Lalruatsanga 6'; Pratik Swami 11'; Lalbiakzuala 19'; Malsawmtluanga Pautu 21'; Aaron Dcosta 31'	Report	Savan Shamrao Lotlikar 20'; Michael Nevil Dias 26', 36'; Clive Miranda 28'; Ronaldo Rosebud Pereira 31'; Fredsan Marshall 35'

Swarnim Gujarat Sports University

5 July 2024
19:00 IST

FC Thyristor	3-5	Golazo FC
K Roluahpuia 3', 6'; Lalawmpuia 36'	Report	Stephen Satarkar 1'; Jayesh Sutar 15', 19'; Clinton Rosario D'souza 31'; Sachin Patil 32'

Swarnim Gujarat Sports University

=== Final ===
7 July 2024
17:00 IST

Corbett FC	3-2	Golazo FC
Lalbiakzuala 9'; Pc Lalruatsanga 37', 50'	Report	Stephen Satarkar 13'; Jayesh Sutar 37'

Swarnim Gujarat Sports University

== Top scorers ==
Rank	Player	Team	Goals
1	(India) PC Lalruatsanga	Corbett FC	17
2	(India) Stephen Satarkar	Golazo FC	14
3	(India) K Roluahpuia	FC Thyristor	12
4	(India) Nikhil Ayyappa Nunna	Bangalore Arrows FC	9
5	(India) Ibrahim Ali	Speed Force FC	8

== See also ==
- 2023–24 Santosh Trophy
- 2024 National Beach Soccer Championship
