= Sports University =

Sports University may refer to:

== China ==
- Beijing Sport University
- Chengdu Sport University
- Guangzhou Sport University
- Harbin Sport University
- Shanghai University of Sport
- Wuhan Sports University

== India ==
- Delhi Sports University
- National Sports University
- Netaji Subhas University of Sports and Entrepreneurship
- Punjab Sports University
- Sri Sri Aniruddhadeva Sports University
- Swarnim Gujarat Sports University

== Other ==
- American Sports University
- German Sport University Cologne
- Korea National Sport University, South Korea
- Lithuanian Sports University
- National Taiwan Sport University
- National Taiwan University of Sport
- Sports University of Tirana, Albania
- United States Sports University
