= Nivia Sports =

Indian sports equipment manufacturing company

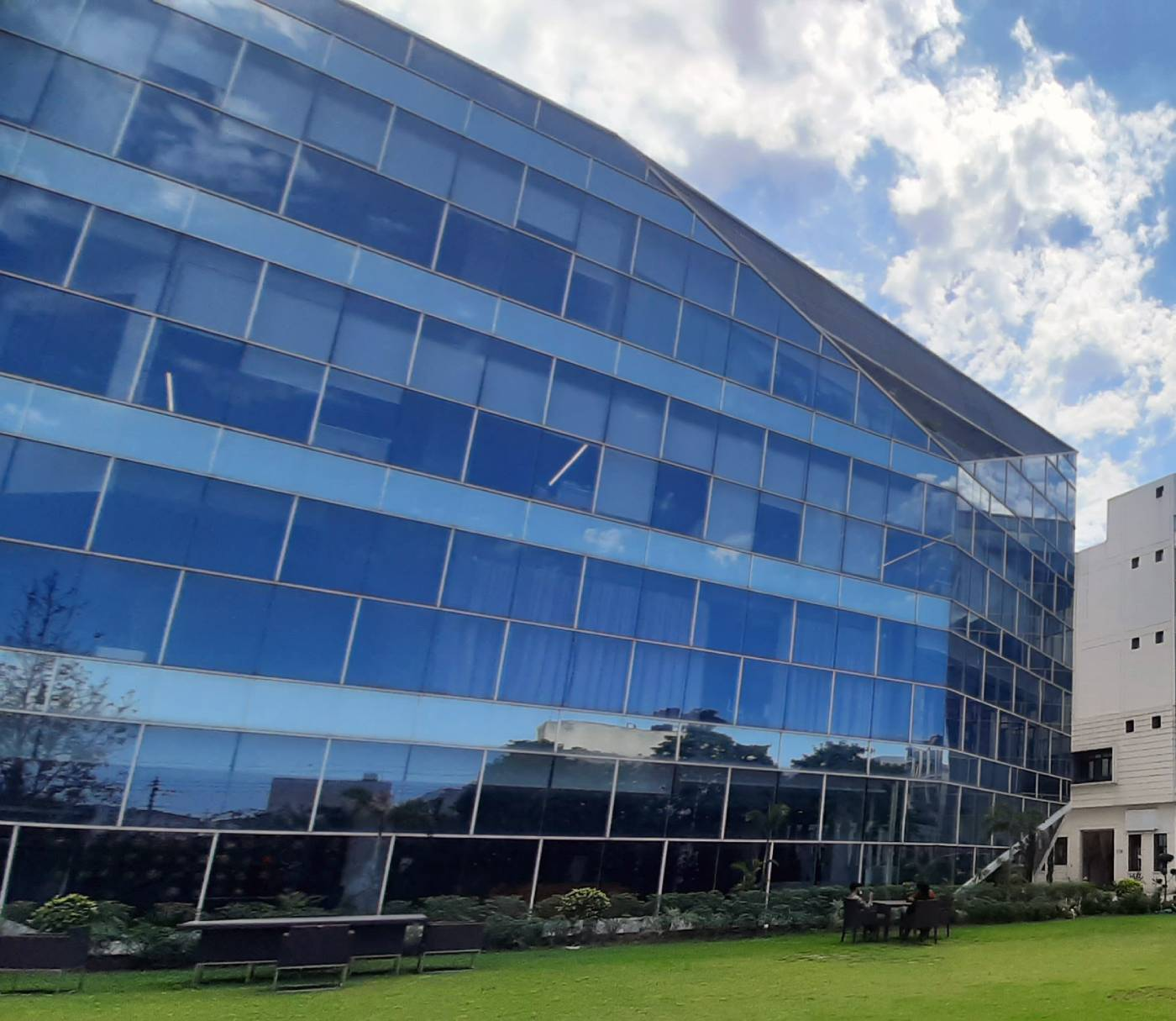
- Headquarters in Jalandhar, India
- Type: Private
- Industry: Sports equipment, textile
- Founded: 1934; 92 years ago
- Founder: Nihal Chand Kharabanda
- Headquarters: Jalandhar, India
- Area served: Worldwide
- Key people: Vijay Kharabanda (Chairman & managing director; 1940–2017); Rajesh Kharabanda (managing director)
- Products: Sports Shoes, Sports Balls and more
- Brands: Nivia
- Number of employees: 2000
- Website: www.niviasports.com

Nivia Sports is an Indian sports equipment company founded in 1934 in Sialkot, now headquartered in Jalandhar, Punjab. It manufactures sports gear, accessories, athletic wear, and footwear and serves as the official ball partner for leagues like ISL and FIBA-certified events. The brand name, a blend of founder Nihal Chand Kharabanda and his son Vijay’s names, reflects its legacy. In 2024, Nivia signed a five-year MoU with Arunachal Pradesh Football Association to provide sportswear and footballs.

Freewill Sports Pvt Ltd was founded in 1934 in Sialkot by Nihal Chand Kharabanda, who laid the groundwork for the company’s focus on sports equipment. In the subsequent years, his son, Vijay Kharabanda, joined the business, taking on management responsibilities and contributing to its development. It's listed in one of the top ten brands in sports industry in India.

The brand name "Nivia" is a portmanteau created from the initial letters of the founders' names: "Ni" from Nihal and "Vi" from Vijay. This naming convention reflects the familial connection and continuity within the company. Over the years, Nivia has become known for its diverse range of sports products, emphasizing the legacy and vision established by its founders.

== History ==
Logo used till 2022

=== The founder's era ===
Freewill was established in 1934 at Sialkot, by Nihal Chand Kharabanda. After the partition of the Indian subcontinent into two separate countries of India and Pakistan, the company shifted its base from Sialkot to Mumbai, India. From Mumbai, it shifted to Meerut and finally settled down in Jalandhar, Punjab in 1950. He was a post-graduate in political science from Jalandhar, Punjab and joined the National Institute of Sports in Patiala, Punjab to enhance his knowledge about sports equipment and worked according to the needs of Indian sports industries.

=== Vijay Kharabanda era ===
Nihal Chand Kharabanda's son, Vijay Kharabanda joined his father's business in 1960. The brand Nivia was registered in 1962 and the letters "VI" of the brand name were taken from his first name. He introduced the nozzles in football to the sports equipment manufacturing industry football and managed to get FIFA Pro Approvals. He also helped revolutionize the Indian footwear market by launching a plastic sole shoe called NIVIA Low Cut.

The company launched a full range of hand-stitched leather balls for football, volleyball, and basketball games.

=== Rajesh Kharabanda era ===
In 1991, Rajesh Kharabanda, son of Vijay Kharabanda, joined the company.

In 2005, Rajesh Kharabanda was appointed as the managing director. He put his experience and succeed to get certification for basketball from the International Basketball Federation.

In 2015, Rajesh Kharabanda signed a partnership with BRICS Football Cup, and Nivia has become the official ball partner of BRICS. The agreement was signed in the presence of H. E Tovar da Silva Nunes, the ambassador of Brazil in India. He was successfully got the FIFA Pro approval for Nivia balls.

In 2021, His efforts to get approval from the FIBA and BFI were worthy and Nivia became the official ball partner af all matches played under Basketball Federation of India. The ball has been used by both junior-level and national-level competitions.

In 2022, Rajesh Kharabanda along with Abhishek Bachchan, and Vita Dani the co-owner of Chennaiyin FC had launched a kit for the 2022–23 season. This includes all three home, away, and third together. These were designed by the fans through a contest held during the year 2022.

Rajesh Kharabanda is also appointed as chairperson by SGMEA, he projected a workforce to work remotely for stitching footballs. This would help workers who couldn't resume their jobs after the pandemic.

== Products ==
Nivia Sports manufactures and markets sports products, sports wear, bags and accessories used for training and competition for sports including football, volleyball, basketball, handball, cricket, running, fitness etc.

=== Football ===
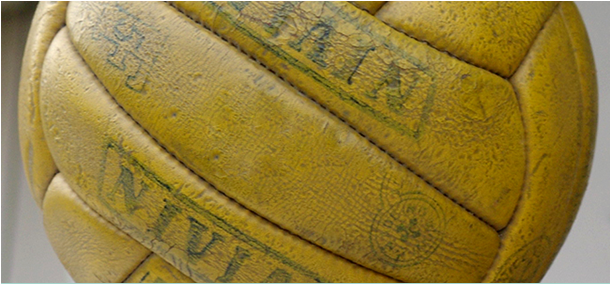
Nivia Sports hand-stitched football from 1960s

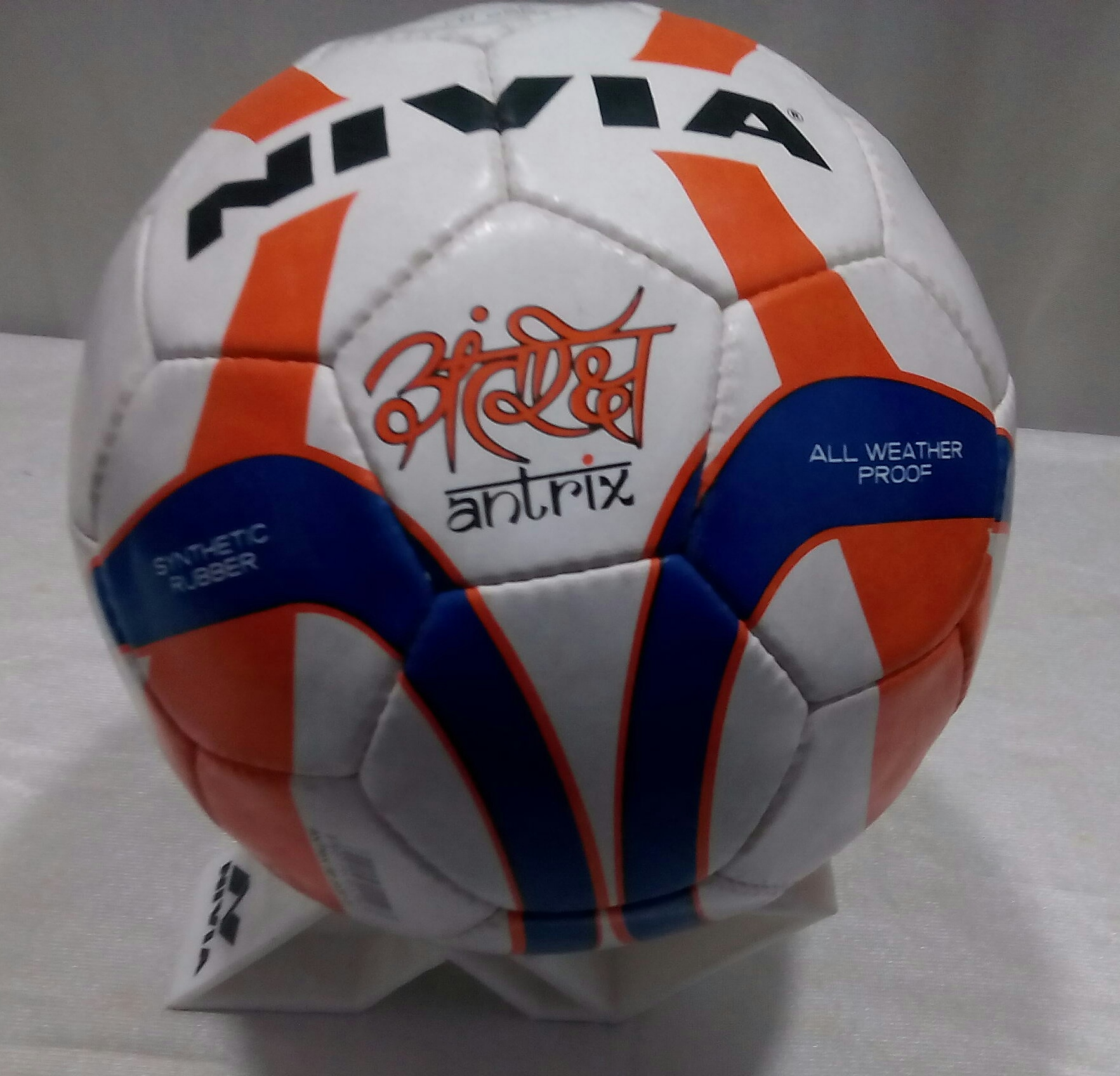
Nivia Antrix

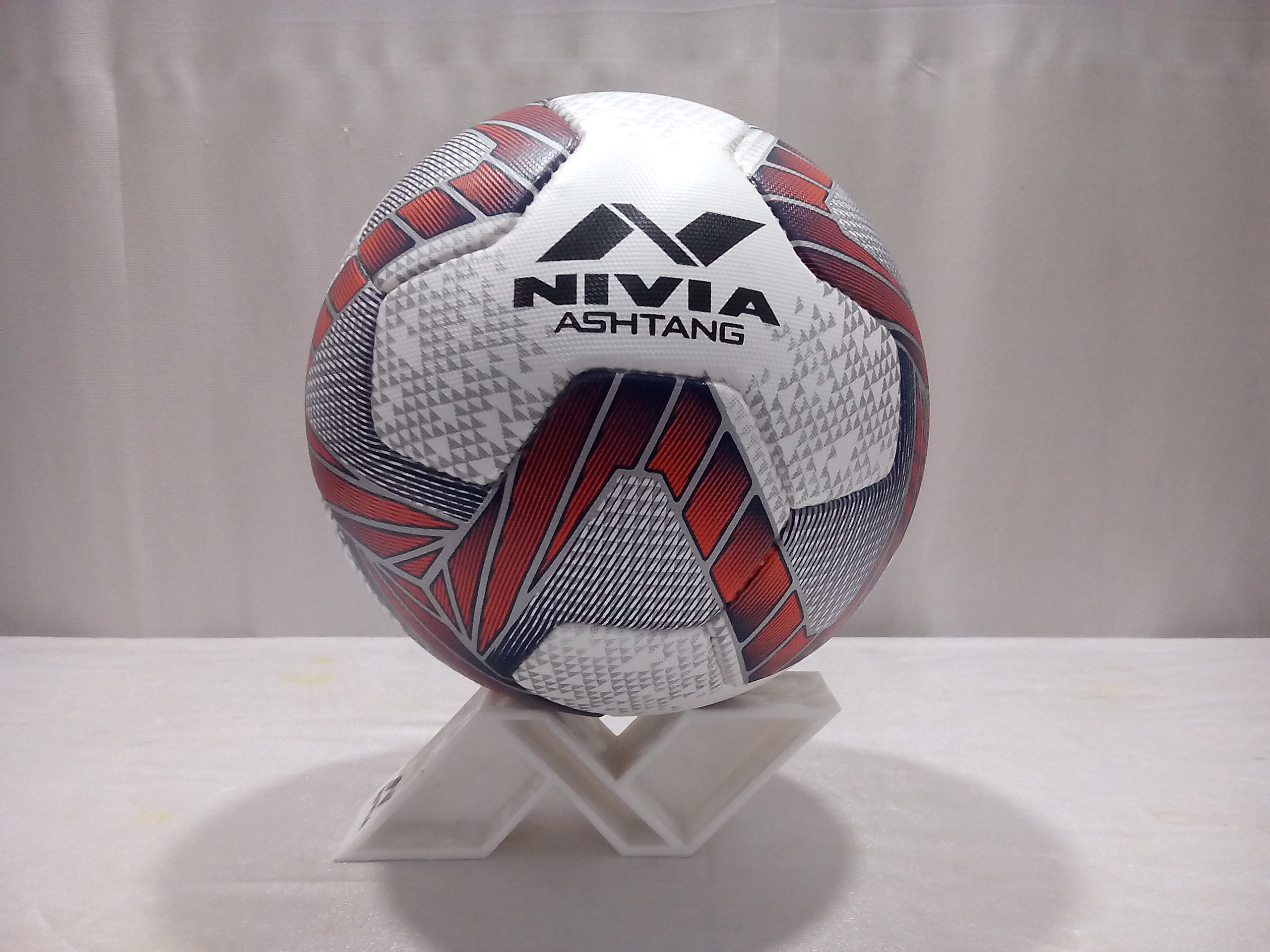
Nivia Ashtang

Nivia Antrix (top left), Nivia Ashtang (top right)

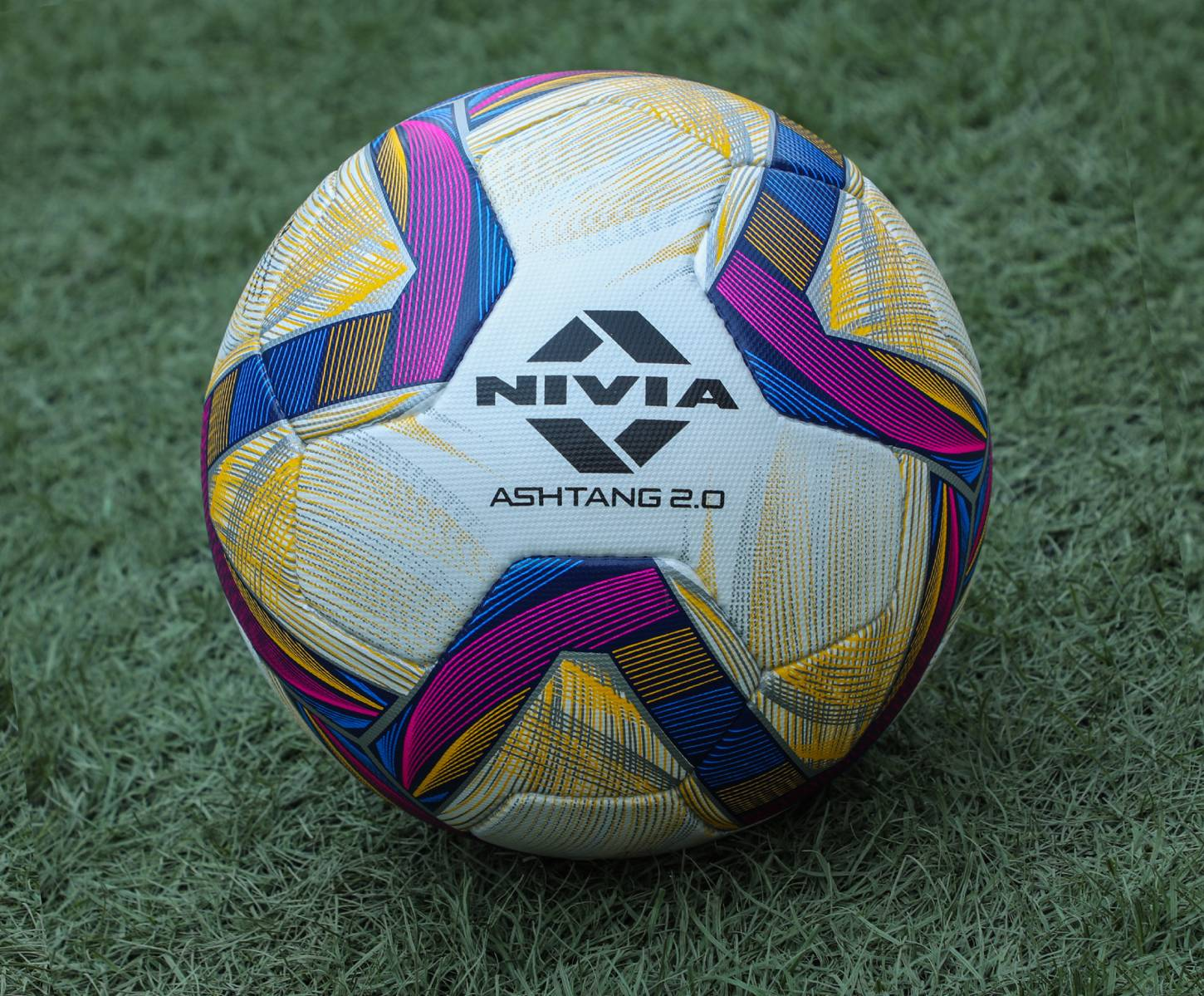
Ashtang 2.0 models

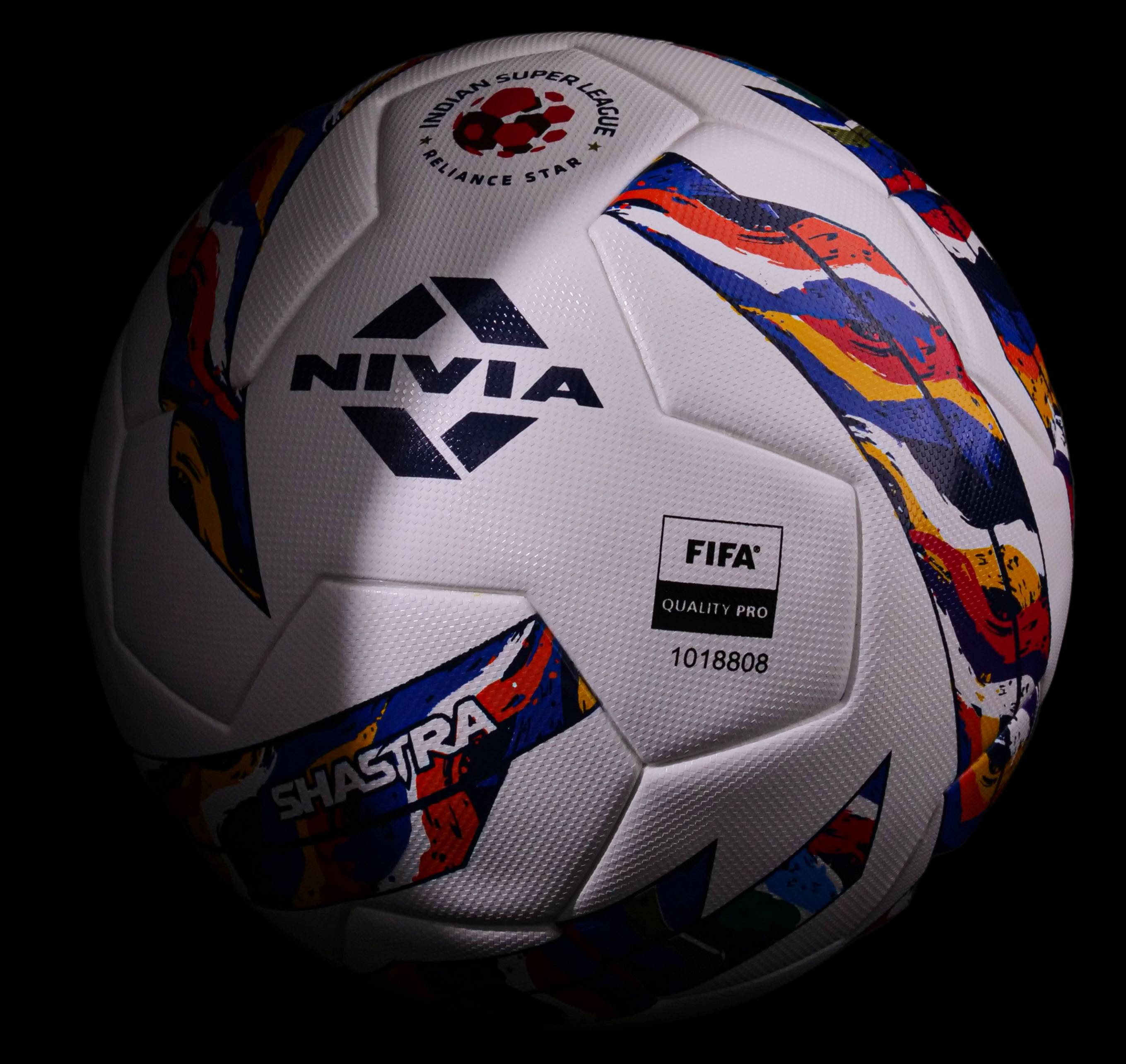
Nivia Shastra 2.0

Ashtang 2.0 models (bottom left), Nivia Shastra 2.0 (bottom right)

Nivia Sports was the first Indian sports equipment manufacturer to produce hand-stitched balls including footballs. In the 1950s, under Freewill Sports Pvt Ltd, Nivia Sports started manufacturing hand-stitched leather footballs, basketballs, and volleyballs. The company exported its balls to international markets, with its first consignment of 30 balls shipped to Indonesia. In the 1960s Nivia football received the approval of the National Institute of Sports, Patiala, Punjab, India. Its football became the official ball for the National Football Championship and for the All India Football Federation (AIFF). In the 1980s, Nivia was selected as the official ball for the International Football Tournament Jawaharlal Nehru Gold Cup and South Asian Federation (SAF) Games. Also it has been the official ball partner for the Hero Indian Super League (ISL).

Nivia Sports has also produced and sponsored other accessories related to football, such as boots, uniforms, goalkeeper gloves, goal nets, training gear, shin guards, ball pump.

NIVIA Sports introduced Astra, the official match ball for Indian Super League 2021–2022. The soccer ball is made with PU micro-fiber leather, in 8-panel structure which technically reduces the seam length by 23%. Astra replaced Ashtang soccer ball in the new season.

In August 2024, the Hero Indian Super League (ISL) announced a three-year partnership with Nivia, appointing them as the official ball partner. As part of this agreement, Nivia will supply the league with its latest ball model, the NIVIA 'Ashtang,' starting from the 2024 season. Ashtang is the official ball throughout the I-League sessions.

The football Shastra 2.0 by Nivia Sports has been selected as the official ball for the Hero Indian Super League (ISL). Starting with the 2024 season, this ball will be used in all ISL matches over the next three years.

=== Basketball ===
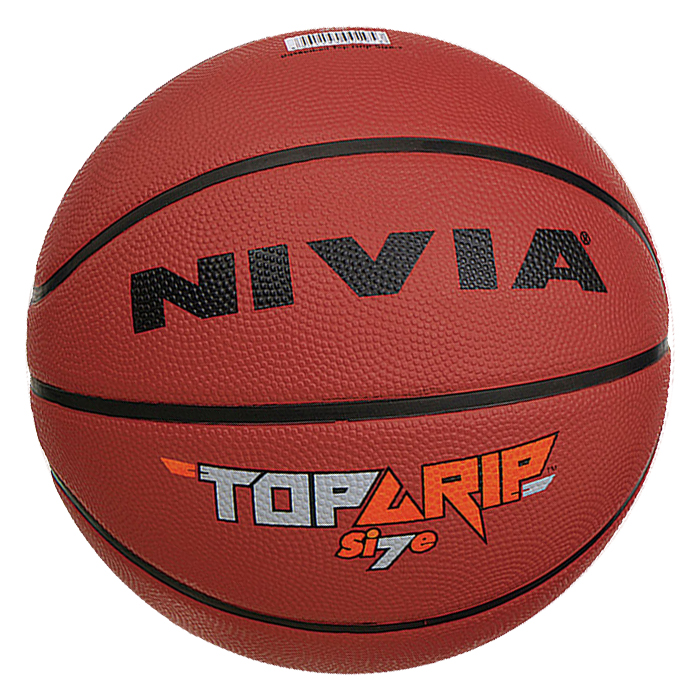
Nivia basketball (above), and G20-20 volleyball

Nivia makes handmade balls. The basketball initially goes to a machine where a rubber blob is squeezed to flatten it to a thinner size, giving it a round shape. Then other stitching, and painting works are done manually by hand. CNNMoney showed the making of basketballs in Nivia's factory in Jalandhar (Punjab), India.

NIvia Sports's basketball 'Top Gear 3.0' has received certification from International Basketball Federation (FIBA).

Nivia has become the official ball partner for the Basketball Federation of India (BFI) from 2021 until 2025. It has provided official game balls for all matches organised by the BFI and FIBA.

=== Volleyball ===
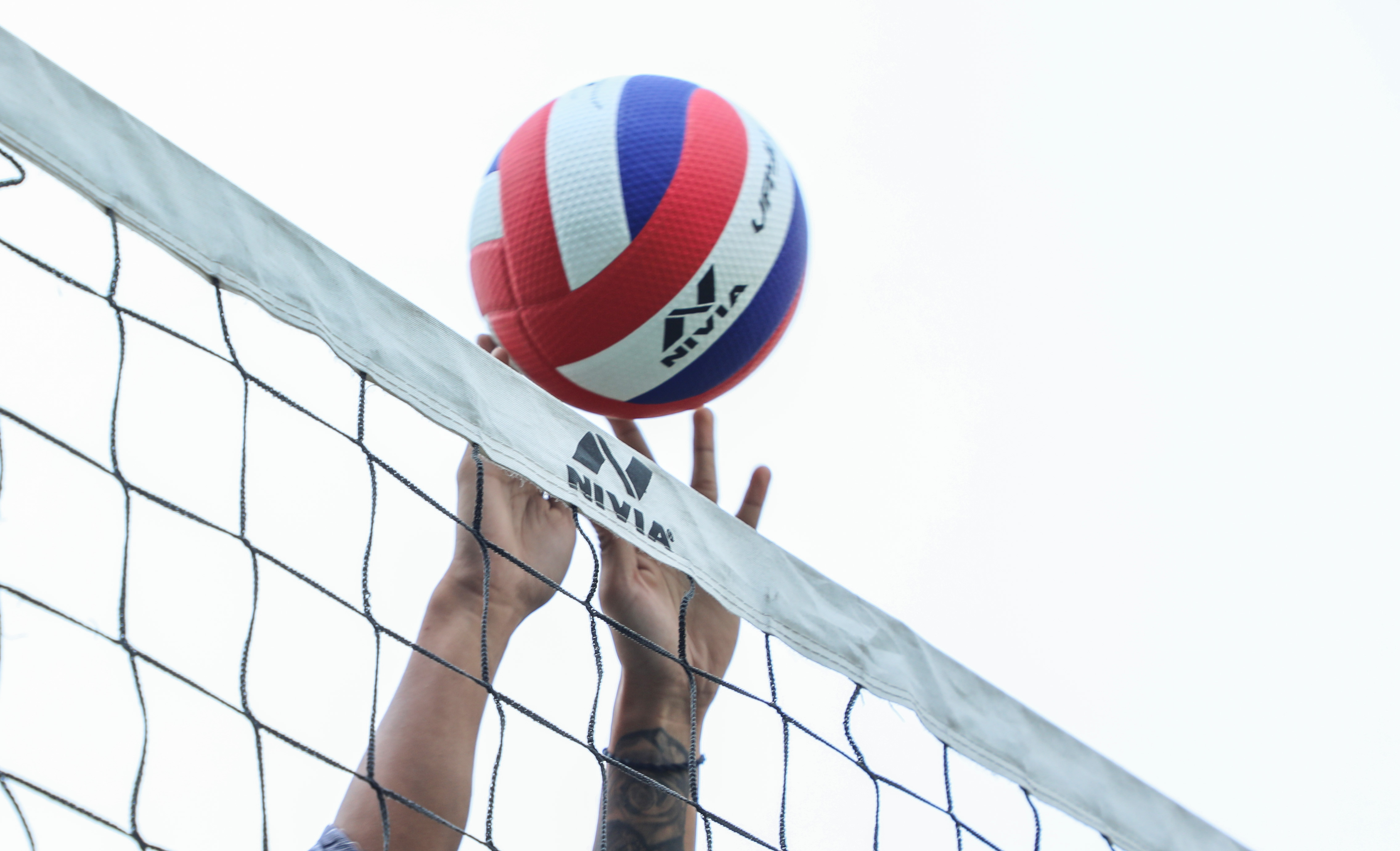
Nivia Vayu Volleyball

In 1963, for the Pre-Olympic Volleyball Championship in New Delhi, India, the Nivia volleyball was chosen as the official ball for the tournament.

=== Handball ===
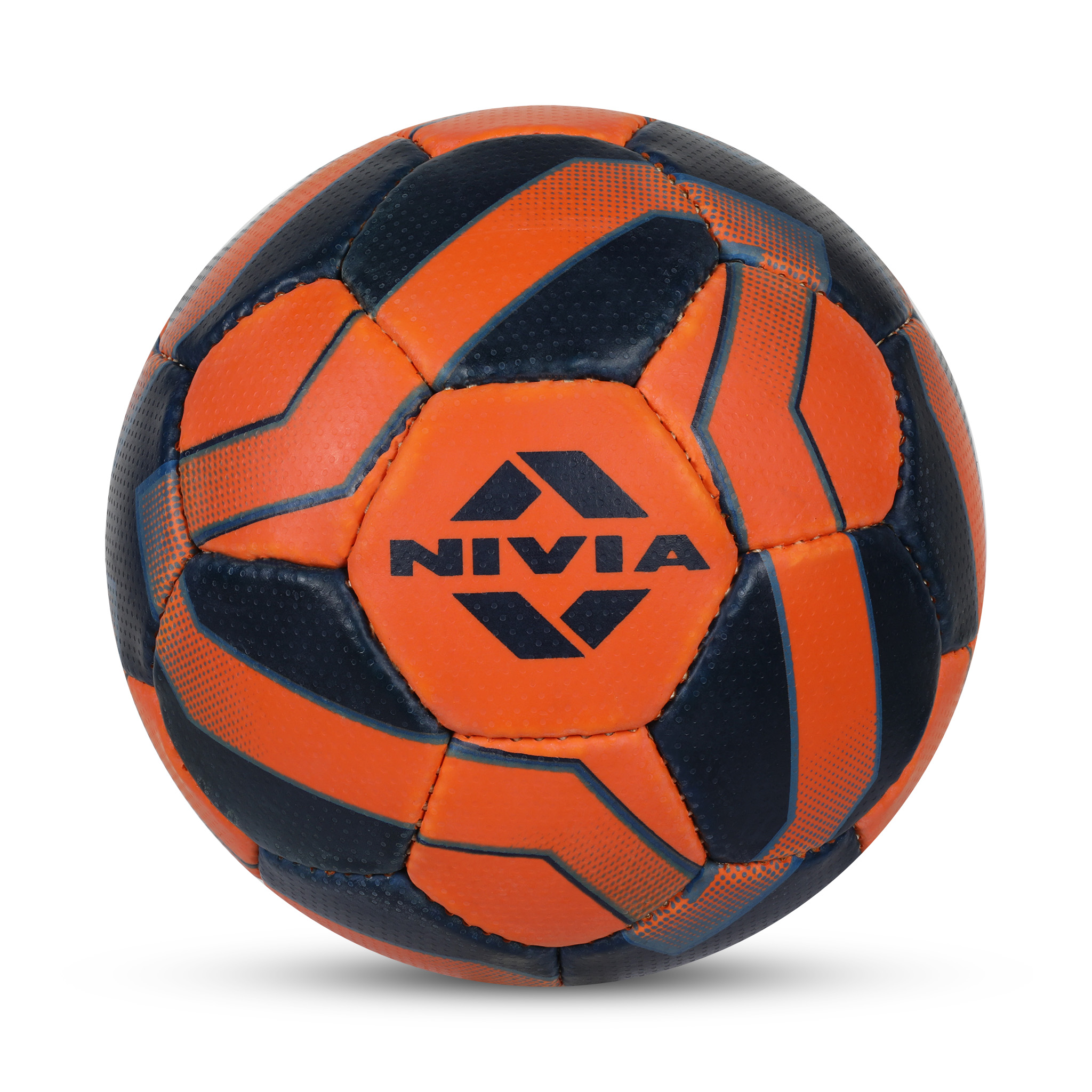
Nivia Handball

Nivia Sports is a manufacturer of handballs.

The Delhi Panzers, a team in the Premier Handball League (PHL), have established a partnership with Nivia Sports, designating Nivia as their official kit supplier. Nivia Sports will provide the Delhi Panzers with their playing kits and equipment.

Nivia Sports, in partnership with the Women's Handball League (WHL), has announced the initiation of the 'Future Handball Champions Program,' set to commence in January 2025. This initiative aims to identify and nurture young female handball talent across India, providing a structured pathway for emerging athletes.

=== Cricket ===
Nivia Sports also manufactures cricket balls, and cricketing apparels.

=== Athletic shoes ===
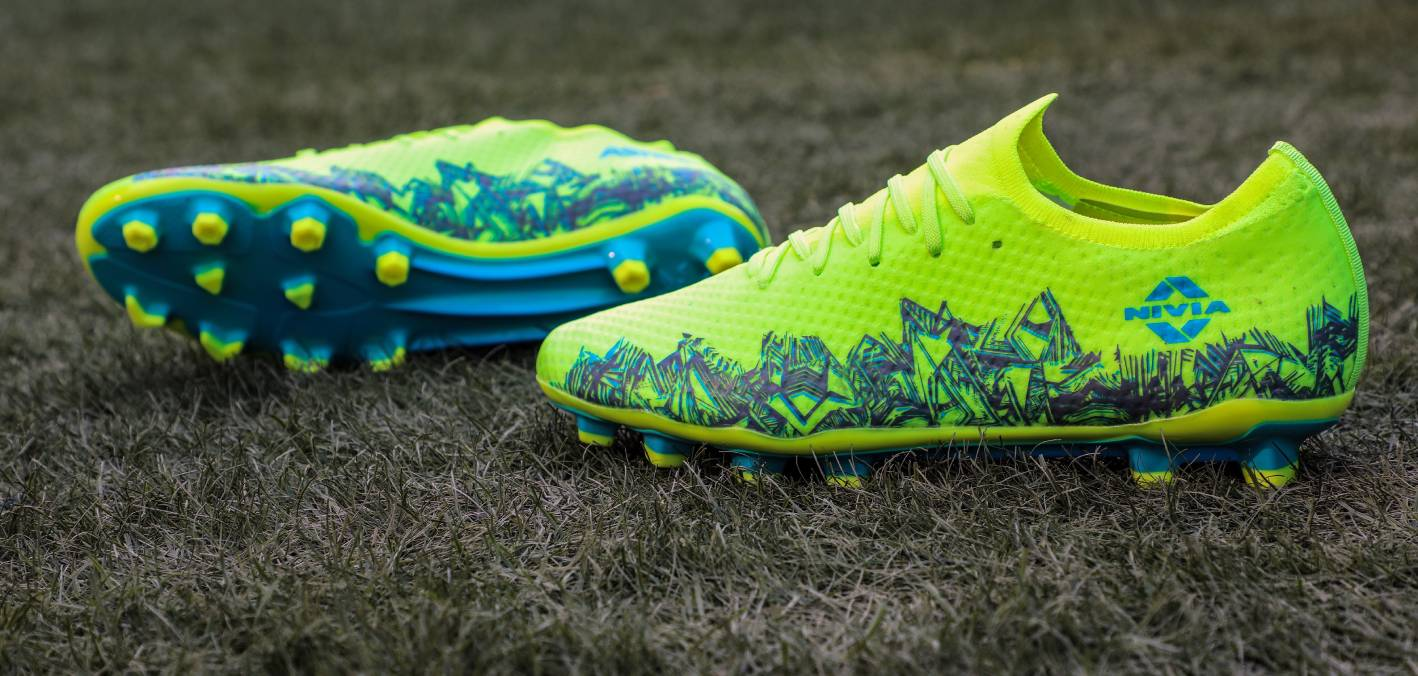
NIVIA Shastra, Football shoes

During the 1980s, Nivia Sports started manufacturing sports footwear in India. Through the years, the company added footwear for use in other games such as cricket, football, basketball, volleyball, badminton, tennis, kabaddi, wrestling, and track & field. They also produced shoelaces and gel insoles.

==== Football boots ====
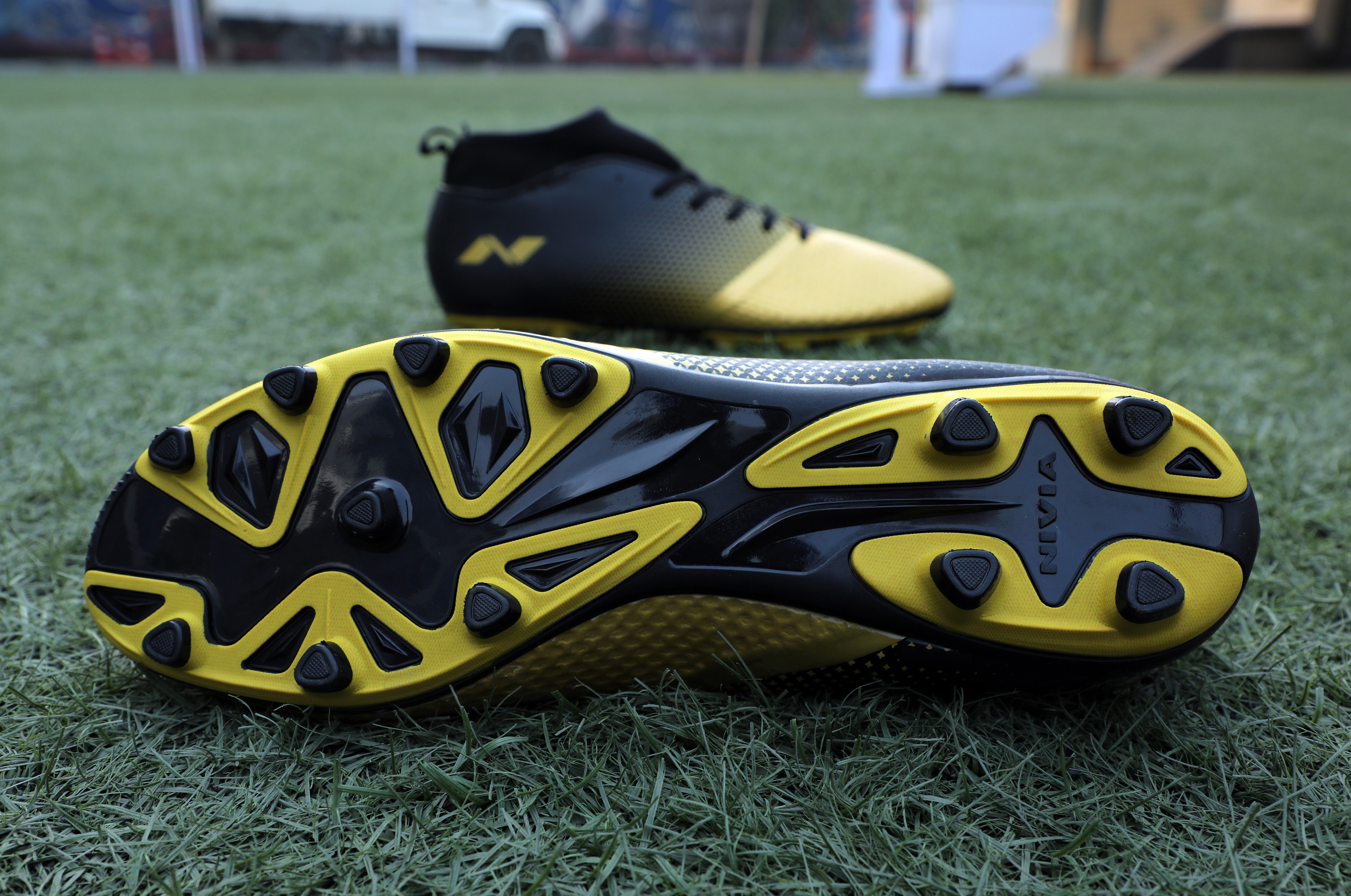
Nivia Ashtang Gold Football

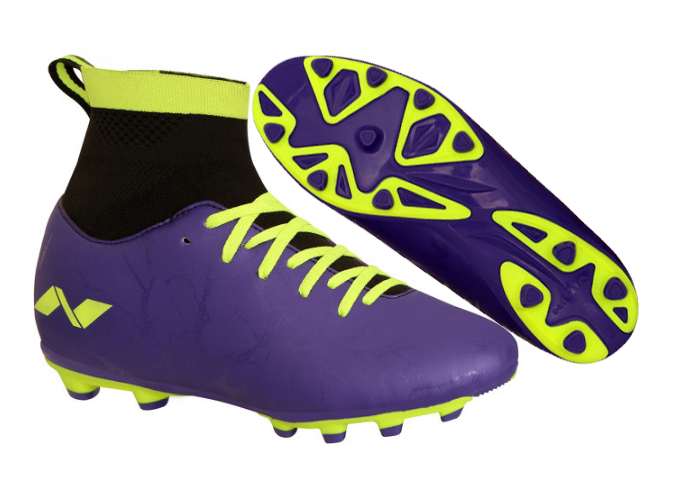
Nivia Oslar Blade, football boot

The series of shoes includes identical properties as per their categories. It involves, Aviator, Brasil, Crane, Dominator, Ditmar, Destroyer, England, Encounter, Pro Encounter, Germany, Invader, Oslar, Oslar blade, Premier, Premier Carbonite, Premier Cleats, Spain, Tough, and Ultra.

=== Apparels ===
Nivia sports has been appointed as the official apparel partner for BFI and FIBA Backed 3x3 Pro Basketball League.

==== Jersey ====
Nivia Sports manufactures jerseys for all sports. It has been the official sports partner for many of the sports clubs. Nivia Jerseys are made up of micro polyester and Nivia is the official partner for the largest clubs like Mohun Bagan SG, Chennaiyin FC and sports leagues as ISL, FIBA, BFI.

=== Accessories ===
Nivia Sports produces sports accessories such as kits or bags, tracksuits, shorts, lowers, shocks, and windcheaters for use in cricket, football, basketball, and volleyball. The company has contributed sports equipment, footwear and accessories including badminton rackets and shuttlecocks, strings, skateboards, skating wheels, squash rackets, and swimming accessories like earplugs, fins, masks, and aqua boards.

== Sponsorships ==
=== Basketball ===
==== National Team ====
- India

=== Futsal ===
- (India) Futsal Club Championship

Handball

- Handball Federation of India

=== Football ===
==== National Teams ====
- Bhutan
- Mauritius (2023–present)
- India (2026–present)

==== Federations and associations ====
- Bhutan Football Federation (Official match ball sponsor)
- All India Football Federation (2018 – Present)
- Football Sri Lanka (2019- 2021)

==== Clubs Teams ====
- (India) ATK (Football Club) (2015–19)
- (India) Delhi FC (2023–present)
- (Sri Lanka) Colombo FC (2018–present)
- (India) DSK Shivajians FC (2015–17)
- (India) Shillong Lajong FC (2017–18)
- (India) Jamshedpur FC (2017–present)
- (India) Mohun Bagan Super Giant (2020–2024)
- (India) Chennaiyin FC (2021–2023)
- (India) Chennai City FC (2019–2023)
- (India) TRAU FC (2019–20)
- (India) Corbett FC (2021–present)
- (India) Churchill Brothers (2011–17; 2018–present)
- (India) Sreenidi Deccan FC (2016–present)
- (India) NEROCA FC (2021–present)
- (India) Real Kashmir FC (2022–present)

=== Domestic leagues ===
- (India) Indian Super League (Official match ball and staff officials kit sponsor) (2018–present)
- (India) I-League
- (India) I-League 2nd Division
- (India) Durand Cup
- Super Cup (India)
- Nepal Super League (Official match ball sponsor)
- Bangladesh Women's Super League (Official match ball sponsor) (2023–present)
- Sri Lanka Super League (Official match ball sponsor)
- (India) Kerala Women's League
- (Singapore) Singa Cup (2018 – 2019)
- (India) Subroto Cup (2017–Present)
- (India) 3x3 Pro Basketball League (3BL) (2021 – Present)
- (India) Indian National Basketball League (2021 – Present)
- (India) Elite Pro Basketball League (2021 – Present)
- Bhutan Premier League (2019 – Present)
- (India) 2024 Gujarat Super League (2024)
- (India) 2025 Bengal Super League (2025)

=== Referees ===
- (Liberia) LFA First Division
  - Liberian Second Division
