= 2024–25 Futsal Club Championship =

Fourth edition of Hero Futsal Club Championship

Tournament details
- Country: India
- Cities: Rudrapur, Uttarakhand
- Venue: Shri Manoj Sarkar Stadium
- Dates: 3–18 August 2025
- Teams: 17

Final positions
- Champions: Goal Hunterz (1st title)
- Runners-up: Bhawanipore

Tournament statistics
- Matches played: 35
- Goals scored: 345 (9.86 per match)
- Attendance: 2,530 (72 per match)
- Top goal scorer(s): Nikhil Mali (16 goals)

The 2024–25 Futsal Club Championship was the 4th edition of the Futsal Club Championship, an annual futsal club tournament in India organised by the All India Football Federation (AIFF).

On 18 August 2025, Goal Hunterz FC defeated Bhawanipore Club by 4–2 to become champions of this edition. Nikhil Mali scored the highest numbers of goals in the tournament; 16 goals for Bhawanipore.

== Format ==
The Futsal Club Championship 2024–25 features a total of 17 teams divided into four groups in a round-robin format. Winners and runners-up of each group proceeded to quarter-finals.

== Teams ==
Locations of Futsal Club Championship teams
Group A
Group B
Group C
Group D

Team	State	City
Aphuyemi	Nagaland	Pughoboto
Real Lona	Ladakh	Kargil
Triumph	Himachal Pradesh	Mandi
Corbett	Uttarakhand	Rudrapur
Juggernaut	Gujarat	Ahmedabad
Goal Hunterz	Delhi	New Delhi
Minerva Academy	Punjab	Mohali
Ambelim	Goa	Ambelim
Golazo	Himachal Pradesh	Hamirpur
Bhawanipore	West Bengal	Kolkata
Thlangtiang	Mizoram	Aizwal
Hazrat Nizamuddin	Madhya Pradesh	Bhopal
Pondicherry United	Pondicherry	Pondicherry
K3	Karnataka	Bengaluru
TOFA	Telangana	Hyderabad
Real Malabar	Kerala	Kondotty
O.G.P.C.	Odisha	Cuttack

== Group stage ==
=== Group A ===
Pos	Team	Pld	W	D	L	GF	GA	GD	Pts	Qualification
1	Juggernaut	4	4	0	0	35	7	+28	12	Advanced to Knockout stage
2	Minerva Academy	4	3	0	1	31	15	+16	9	Advanced to Knockout stage
3	Aphuyemi	4	2	0	2	22	37	−15	6	
4	Real Lona	4	0	1	3	3	17	−14	1	
5	Triumph	4	0	1	3	8	23	−15	1	

Source: AIFF
3 August 2025
12:00 IST

Triumph	1–1	Real Lona
Thakur 32'	Report	M. Hussain 30'

Shri Manoj Sarkar Stadium, Rudrapur, Uttarakhand
Attendance: 100
Referee: K. Surendiran
3 August 2025
14:30 IST

Minerva Academy	2–8	Juggernaut
Lalnunchhana 10'; Lalruatzela 32'	Report	Sunny 1', 15', 34'; Rana 18'; Yadav 23', 37'; Shah 26'; R. Chhetri 40'

Shri Manoj Sarkar Stadium, Rudrapur, Uttarakhand
Attendance: 100
Referee: Sayeed Khaleel

5 August 2025
12:00 IST

Juggernaut	17–4	Aphuyemi
Rana 1', 4'; Sunny 2', 3', 21', 23', 24'; Fernandes 13', 32'; R. Chhetri 14'; Mutkekar 15', 32', 35'; Yadav 17', 19', 22'; Krisnaj 38'	Report	Akumyanger 15', 27'; Sharma 22'; Melvin 36'

Shri Manoj Sarkar Stadium, Rudrapur, Uttarakhand
Attendance: 150
Referee: Tanveer Ahmed Wani
5 August 2025
14:30 IST

Minerva Academy	9–0	Triumph
Thapa 1', 5', 23'; Gaikwad 17'; Lalnunchhana 20'; Patil 22', 27'; Bhairat 25'; Ravikiran 32'	Report

Shri Manoj Sarkar Stadium, Rudrapur, Uttarakhand
Attendance: 20
Referee: Melvin Stany Rodrigues

7 August 2025
12:00 IST

Aphuyemi	6–13	Minerva Academy
Akumyanger 9', 25', 26'; Hangsing 22'; Melvin 28', 29'	Report	Lalnunchhana 1'; Thapa 3', 30' (40); Lalruatzela 18' (31); Patil 18', 19' (38); Bhairat 20', 36'; Gaikwad 37'; Shetty 39'

Shri Manoj Sarkar Stadium, Rudrapur, Uttarakhand
Attendance: 50
Referee: Kisstarlin Wanniang
7 August 2025
14:30 IST

Real Lona	0–5	Jaggernaut
	Report	Sunny 9', 24'; Mutkekar 12'; Rana 36'; Fernandes 38'

Shri Manoj Sarkar Stadium, Rudrapur, Uttarakhand
Attendance: 40
Referee: K. Vihokhe

9 August 2025
12:00 IST

Real Lona	1–7	Minerva Academy
Rana 10'	Report	Patil 4', 7'; Lalruatzela 7'; Lalnunchhana 13' (14); Avishek 15'; Shetty 40'

Shri Manoj Sarkar Stadium, Rudrapur, Uttarakhand
Attendance: 20
Referee: Paritosh Vats
9 August 2025
14:30 IST

Triumph	6–8	Aphuyemi
Sayam 20', 34', 37'; Loden 30', 38'; Jasrotia 33'	Report	Akumyanger 2', 21', 21', 23', 29', 32', 39'; Hangsing 40'

Shri Manoj Sarkar Stadium, Rudrapur, Uttarakhand
Attendance: 50
Referee: Anshul Dixit

11 August 2025
12:00 IST

Jaggernaut	5–1	Triumph
Mutkekar 3', 27'; Shah 24'; Bangera 34', 35'	Report	Sharma 24'

Shri Manoj Sarkar Stadium, Rudrapur, Uttarakhand
Attendance: 50
Referee: Avijnan Bose
11 August 2025
14:30 IST

Aphuyemi	4–1	Real Lona
Melvin 16', 18', 29', 40'	Report	Rana 26'

Shri Manoj Sarkar Stadium, Rudrapur, Uttarakhand
Attendance: 20
Referee: Vishal Kumar

=== Group B ===
Pos	Team	Pld	W	D	L	GF	GA	GD	Pts	Qualification
1	Bhawanipore	3	3	0	0	32	10	+22	9	Advanced to Knockout stage
2	Corbett	3	1	0	2	18	19	−1	3	Advanced to Knockout stage
3	Thlangtiang	3	1	0	2	11	13	−2	3	
4	Golazo	3	1	0	2	15	34	−19	3	

Source: AIFF
7 August 2025
17:00 IST

Bhawanipore	16–2	Golazo
Laltlansanga 3', 17'; Lalsangkima 19'; Roluahpuia 20', 35'; Laltluangzela 23', 25'; Mali 25'; Sutar 27', 29'; Patil 29'; S. Ali 31', 39'; Khatua 32', 39'; Vanlalduhsaka 35'	Report	Fayaz 13'; Baig 20'

Shri Manoj Sarkar Stadium, Rudrapur, Uttarakhand
Attendance: 200
Referee: Vishal Mahendrabhai Vaja
7 August 2025
19:30 IST

Thlangtiang	3–0	Corbett
Rampianmawia 26'; Lalremtluanga 33'; Lalkhawngaiha 37'; Fernandes 38'	Report

Shri Manoj Sarkar Stadium, Rudrapur, Uttarakhand
Attendance: 200
Referee: Syed Khaleel

9 August 2025
17:00 IST

Golazo	6–4	Thlangtiang
C. D'Souza 1'; Baig 23', 37', 40'; S. D'Souza 30'; Stephen 34'	Report	Lalmuankima 7'; Lalchhantluanga 28'; Remruata 37'; A. S. Singh 40' (o.g.)

Shri Manoj Sarkar Stadium, Rudrapur, Uttarakhand
Attendance: 20
Referee: Avijnan Bose
9 August 2025
19:30 IST

Corbett	4–9	Bhawanipore
Malsawmzela 17'; Pautu 18', 39'; Swami 29'	Report	Sutar 17', 35'; Patil 22'; Mali 24', 26', 28', 37'; Laltluangzela 30'; D'mello 40'

Shri Manoj Sarkar Stadium, Rudrapur, Uttarakhand
Attendance: 500
Referee: Kisstarlin Wanniang

11 August 2025
17:00 IST

Bhawanipore	7–4	Thlangtiang
Mali 1', 31'; Sharma 12'; Roluahpuia 15'; Oraw 32'; Lalmuankima 33' (o.g.); S. Ali 33'	Report	Lalremtluanga 12'; Remruata 27'; Lalrawngbawla 32'; Lalkhawngaiha 40'

Shri Manoj Sarkar Stadium, Rudrapur, Uttarakhand
Attendance: 50
Referee: Ajay Singh
11 August 2025
19:30 IST

Corbett	14–7	Golazo
Lalenkima 9'; Nikam 12'; Lalrinzuala 19'; Swami 21', 31'; C Lalremruata 27', 28'; PC Lalremruata 30', 40'; Lalenkima 35', 37', 38'; Sailung 40'	Report	S. D'Souza 3'; C. D'Souza 15'; Baig 27', 29', 38'; Jaseem 3'; A. S. Singh 35'

Shri Manoj Sarkar Stadium, Rudrapur, Uttarakhand
Attendance: 50
Referee: Kisstarlin Wanniang

=== Group C ===
Pos	Team	Pld	W	D	L	GF	GA	GD	Pts	Qualification
1	Goal Hunterz	3	3	0	0	29	5	+24	9	Advanced to Knockout stage
2	Hazrat Nizamuddin	3	1	0	2	14	19	−5	3	Advanced to Knockout stage
3	K3	3	1	0	2	9	15	−6	3	
4	Pondicherry United	3	1	0	2	9	22	−13	3	

Source: AIFF
8 August 2025
12:00 IST

Hazrat Nizamuddin	2–12	Goal Hunterz
F. Hussain 23'; Raikwar 29'	Report	Gusai 2', 5', 19', 27', 29', 34'; M. Adhikari 5', 14', 37'; Hurria 12', 36'; Shoun 20'

Shri Manoj Sarkar Stadium, Rudrapur, Uttarakhand
Attendance: 50
Referee: K. Surendiran
8 August 2025
14:30 IST

Pondicherry United	5–3	K3
Karunanithi S 8'; Dhilipan 19'; R. Kumar 26'; Raja 31'; Colas 39'	Report	S. Kumar 12'; Suresh 14', 32'

Shri Manoj Sarkar Stadium, Rudrapur, Uttarakhand
Attendance: 25
Referee: Ajay Singh

10 August 2025
12:00 IST

Goal Hunterz	11–2	Pondicherry United
M. Adhikari 3', 12', 24'; Shoun 7'; A. Adhikari 26'; Ngaihte 34'; Gusai 38', 39', 39'	Report	Raja 6'; Elavarasan 19'

Shri Manoj Sarkar Stadium, Rudrapur, Uttarakhand
Attendance: 50
Referee: Vinod Kumar
10 August 2025
14:30 IST

K3	5–4	Hazrat Nizamuddin
Suresh 13', 37'; S. Kumar 33', 34'; Prashanth 23'	Report	Suhanda 7', 32'; R. Singh 20' (o.g.); T. K. Singh 26'

Shri Manoj Sarkar Stadium, Rudrapur, Uttarakhand
Attendance: 25
Referee: Jaydevsinh Chudasama

12 August 2025
12:00 IST

Hazrat Nizamuddin	8–2	Pondicherry United
Walter 29'; Suhanda 33'; F. Hussain 34', 37'; Uppal 34'; Raikwar 36'; T. K. Singh 37'; Shukla 40'	Report	Anandh 18'; Colas 28'

Shri Manoj Sarkar Stadium, Rudrapur, Uttarakhand
Attendance: 50
Referee: Vishal Kumar
12 August 2025
14:30 IST

K3	1–6	Goal Hunterz
Prashanth 35'	Report	Sharma 8', 13'; M. Adhikari 11'; Gusai 24'; Hurria 27'; Gupta 30'

Shri Manoj Sarkar Stadium, Rudrapur, Uttarakhand
Attendance: 20
Referee: Ajay Singh

=== Group D ===
Pos	Team	Pld	W	D	L	GF	GA	GD	Pts	Qualification
1	TOFA	3	2	1	0	15	9	+6	7	Advanced to Knockout stage
2	Ambelim	3	1	2	0	12	9	+3	5	Advanced to Knockout stage
3	Real Malabar	3	1	1	1	13	13	0	4	
4	O.G.P.C.	3	0	0	3	9	18	−9	0	

Source: AIFF
8 August 2025
17:00 IST

TOFA	7–3	O. G. P. C.
Anirudh 3'; Yesudhas 12', 28'; Ali 13'; Malik 14'; Baig 32'; Reddy 39'	Report	Soren 25'; Patel 35'; Rout 36'

Shri Manoj Sarkar Stadium, Rudrapur, Uttarakhand
Attendance: 50
Referee: Divyesh Rajnish Ule
8 August 2025
19:30 IST

Ambelim	4–4	Real Malaber
Pereira 35', 38'; Marshall 39'; Rebello 40'	Report	Luthaife 24'; Midhun 28', 34'; Rinas 37'

Shri Manoj Sarkar Stadium, Rudrapur, Uttarakhand
Attendance: 50
Referee: Melvin Stany Rodriguez

10 August 2025
17:00 IST

O. G. P. C.	3–6	Ambelim
Patel 34'; Naik 37'; P. K. Singh 40'	Report	Pereira 28', 38'; Rebello 29'; Marshall 30', 37'; D'silva 39'

Shri Manoj Sarkar Stadium, Rudrapur, Uttarakhand
Attendance: 50
Referee: Fazil Kareem
10 August 2025
19:30 IST

Real Malabar	4–6	TOFA
Rinas 14', 28'; Mohammedali 31', 34'	Report	Malik 12'; Ali 13', 22'; Yesudhas 26', 27', 40'

Shri Manoj Sarkar Stadium, Rudrapur, Uttarakhand
Attendance: 20
Referee: Tanveer Ahmed Wani

12 August 2025
17:00 IST

TOFA	2–2	Ambelim
Yesudhas 24'; Komarpant 31'	Report	Pereira 8'; Costa 10'

Shri Manoj Sarkar Stadium, Rudrapur, Uttarakhand
Attendance: 50
Referee: Anshul Dixit
12 August 2025
19:30 IST

Real Malabar	5–3	O. G. P. C.
Midhun 4', 40'; Basil 19', 35'; Mohammedali 30'	Report	Patnaik 2'; Soren 26'; Patel 27'

Shri Manoj Sarkar Stadium, Rudrapur, Uttarakhand
Attendance: 25
Referee: Jaydevsinh Chudasama

== Knockout stage ==
=== Bracket ===
Quarter-finals
14 August
Juggernaut	3
Corbett	5
14 August
Goal Hunterz	5
Ambelim	1
14 August
Bhawanipore	16
Minerva Academy	1
14 August
TOFA	7
Hazrat Nizamuddin	1

Semi-finals
16 August
Corbett	3
Goal Hunterz	5
16 August
Bhawanipore	7
TOFA	0

Final
18 August
Goal Hunterz	4
Bhawanipore	2

=== Quarter-finals ===
14 August 2025
10:00 IST

Juggernaut	3–5	Corbett
Yadav 20', 39'; Shah 22'	Report	Swami 5'; Sailung 11'; Lalenkima 18'; Rana 29' (o.g.); PC Lalremruata 39'

Shri Manoj Sarkar Stadium, Rudrapur, Uttarakhand
Attendance: 20
Referee: Kisstarlin Wanniang

14 August 2025
16:00 IST

Goal Hunterz	5–1	Ambelim
Shoun 13'; A. Adhikari 31'; M. Adhikari 35'; Gusai 35', 38'	Report	Lotlikar 35'

Shri Manoj Sarkar Stadium, Rudrapur, Uttarakhand
Attendance: 25
Referee: Syed Khaleel

14 August 2025
13:00 IST

Bhawanipore	16–1	Minerva Academy
Mali 2', 3', 4', 11', 24', 30', 32', 40'; Laltlansanga 11'; Yewale 18' (o.g.); Khatua 19', 26', 27'; Lalsangkima 22'; Roluahpuia 23'; S. Ali 28'	Report	Bhairat 36'

Shri Manoj Sarkar Stadium, Rudrapur, Uttarakhand
Attendance: 50
Referee: Melvin Stany Rodriguez

14 August 2025
19:00 IST

TOFA	7–1	Hazrat Nizamuddin
Malik 5'; Yesudhas 11'; M. A. Ali 14', 24'; Komarpant 26'; Haseeb 29', 31'	Report	T. K. Singh 32'

Shri Manoj Sarkar Stadium, Rudrapur, Uttarakhand
Attendance: 50
Referee: Vinod Kumar

=== Semi-finals ===
16 August 2025
16:00 IST

Corbett	3–5	Goal Hunterz
Pautu 5'; Lalenkima 17'; PC Lalremruata 27'	Report	A. Adhikari 16'; Sharma 19', 24'; Sailung 29' (o.g.); Gusai 40'

Shri Manoj Sarkar Stadium, Rudrapur, Uttarakhand
Attendance: 50
Referee: K. Surendiran

16 August 2025
19:00 IST

Bhawanipore	7–0	TOFA
Sutar 2', 11', 37'; Laltlansanga 4', 15'; Laltluangzela 27'; Mali 34'	Report

Shri Manoj Sarkar Stadium, Rudrapur, Uttarakhand
Attendance: 50
Referee: Tanveer Ahmed Wani

=== Final ===
18 August 2025
18:00 IST

Goal Hunterz	4–2	Bhawanipore
M. Adhikari 2', 36', 40'; Shoun 10'	Report	Khatua 28'; Laltlansanga 32'

Shri Manoj Sarkar Stadium, Rudrapur, Uttarakhand
Attendance: 200
Referee: Vishal Mahendrabhai Vaja

== Top scorers ==
Rank	Player	Team	Goals
1	Nikhil Mali	Bhawanipore	16
2	Bijoy Gusai	Goal Hunterz	13
3	Akumyanger	Aphuyemi	12
4	Mahip Adhikari	Goal Hunterz	11
5	Shibu Sunny	Jaggernaut	10

== See also ==
- 2026 AFC Futsal Asian Cup qualification
- 2026 AFC Futsal Asian Cup
- AFC Futsal Asian Cup
- AFC Futsal Club Championship
- 2024–25 Santosh Trophy
