= 2021–22 Futsal Club Championship =

First edition of Hero Futsal Club Championship

2021–22 Hero Futsal Club Championship
Tournament details
- Country: India
- City: New Delhi
- Venue(s): K. D. Jadhav Indoor Hall, Indira Gandhi Arena
- Dates: 5–13 November 2021
- Teams: 16

Final positions
- Champions: Delhi FC (1st title)
- Runners-up: Mohammedan SC

Tournament statistics
- Matches played: 27
- Goals scored: 297 (11 per match)
- Attendance: 1,600 (59 per match)
- Top goal scorer: Nikhil Mali (24 goals)

Awards
- Best player: Nikhil Mali
- Best goalkeeper: Scott Moraes

The 2021–22 Futsal Club Championship was the inaugural edition of the Futsal Club Championship, an annual futsal club tournament in India organised by the All India Football Federation (AIFF), being held in New Delhi. It was initially planned to be organised in July–August 2020. However, due to COVID-19 pandemic, the championship was held from 5–13 November in K. D. Jadhav Indoor Hall of Indira Gandhi Arena.

== Format ==
The Futsal Club Championship 2021 featured a total of 16 teams, who were divided into four groups, and played in a round-robin format. The highest-placed team from each group made it to the semi-final stage, which was played in a knockout format amongst the four teams. The winners of the tournament, Delhi FC, became the first-ever futsal champions of India, and thus India's first ever AFC Futsal Club Championship representative.

== Teams ==
AIFF invited clubs playing in Indian Super League, I-League and state level futsal champions to participate in the inaugural season, and 16 teams participated.

Locations of Hero Futsal Club Championship teams

Team	City/State
Baroda FA	Vadodara, Gujarat
Bengaluru FC	Bengaluru, Karnataka
Chanmari Zothan	Aizawl, Mizoram
Classic FA	Imphal, Manipur
Delhi FC	Delhi
Kuppuraj FC	Puducherry
Mangala Club	Cuttack, Odisha
Mohammedan SC	Kolkata, West Bengal
Niaw Wasa F.C.	Shillong, Meghalaya
Real Kashmir	Srinagar, Jammu and Kashmir
Sudeva Delhi FC	Delhi
SC Goa	Panaji, Goa
Speed Force FC	Telangana
Super Strikers FC	Bengaluru, Karnataka
Telongjem FC	Kohima, Nagaland
TRAU FC	Imphal, Manipur

== Group stage ==
=== Group A ===
Pos	Team	Pld	W	D	L	GF	GA	GD	Pts	Qualification
1	Mohammedan SC	3	3	0	0	18	4	+14	9	Knockout stage
2	Super Strikers FC	3	1	0	2	13	13	0	3	
3	Chanmari Zothan	3	1	0	2	12	12	0	3	
4	Baroda FA	3	1	0	2	6	20	−14	3	

Source: AIFF
Rules for classification: Group stage tiebreakers
5 November 2021
12:00

Baroda FA	0–9	Mohammedan SC
	Report	Gurkha 6' (o.g.); Patel 11' (o.g.); Malpote 12'; Patil 16'; Noronha 28'; Fernandes 30'; Pereira 31'; Bhatt 36' (o.g.); Vaz 39'

KD Jadhav Indoor Hall, New Delhi
Attendance: 50
Referee: Stanley Jones, Priyobarta Singh
5 November 2021
14:30

Chanmari Zothan	4–6	Super Strikers FC
Laltlansanga 13'; Dawngliana 15'; Lalmuankima 38'; Lalrinsanga 39'	Report	Surya 9', 10'; Vijay 17', 36', 38'; Fracis 26'

KD Jadhav Indoor Hall, New Delhi
Attendance: 100
Referee: Vishal Vaja, Syed Khaleel

7 November 2021
12:00

Chanmari Zothan	7–1	Baroda FA
Roluahpuia 1'; Laltlansanga 9'; Lalnunmawia 17', 23', 25', 37'; Laltlanthanga 22'	Report	Parikh 2'

KD Jadhav Indoor Hall, New Delhi
Attendance: 50
Referee: Tanveer Ahmed, Anshul Dixit
7 November 2021
14:30

Super Strikers FC	3–4	Mohammedan SC
Surya 13', 28'; Vijay 15'	Report	Malpote 3'; Noronha 22'; Patil 23', 31' (pen.)

KD Jadhav Indoor Hall, New Delhi
Attendance: 40
Referee: Ajay Singh, VL Rinpuia

9 November 2021
12:00

Mohammedan SC	5–1	Chanmari Zothan
Pereira 11', 22', 38'; Fernandes 28'; Medeira 31'	Report	Roluahpuia 33'

KD Jadhav Indoor Hall, New Delhi
Attendance: 30
Referee: Priyobarta Singh, Shyamson Chongtham
9 November 2021
14:30

Super Strikers FC	4–5	Baroda FA
Pereira 9', 33'; Easwaran 15'; Nunna 39'	Report	Parikh 7', 30', 32'; Doshi 38'; Patel 39'

KD Jadhav Indoor Hall, New Delhi
Attendance: 30
Referee: Syed Khaleel, Kisstarlin Wanniang

=== Group B ===
Pos	Team	Pld	W	D	L	GF	GA	GD	Pts	Qualification
1	Bengaluru FC	3	2	0	1	14	7	+7	6 (Note: Head-to-head points: Bengaluru FC Futsal 3, Sporting Clube de Goa 0.)	Knockout stage
2	SC Goa	3	2	0	1	13	10	+3	6	
3	Speed Force FC	3	1	0	2	16	24	−8	3 (Note: Head-to-head points: Speed Force FC 3, Kuppuraj FC 0.)	
4	Kuppuraj FC	3	1	0	2	12	14	−2	3	

Source: AIFF
Rules for classification: Group stage tiebreakers
Notes:
5 November 2021
17:00

Kuppuraj FC	7–9	Speed Force FC
Vivek 9', 19', 20'; Alson 12'; Rajaganapathy 13'; Ahamed 15'; Jijo 33'	Report	Sultan 4'; Ali 2', 3', 19', 20', 31', 32'; Dayma 35'; Hussain 37'

KD Jadhav Indoor Hall, New Delhi
Attendance: 50
Referee: Ajay Singh, Tanveer Ahmed
5 November 2021
19:30

SC Goa	2–3	Bengaluru FC
Ll. Cardozo 14'; Totad 26'	Report	Nickson 30'; Yadav 33'; Rossario 39'

KD Jadhav Indoor Hall, New Delhi
Attendance: 100
Referee: VL Rinpuia, Anshul Dixit

7 November 2021
17:00

Kuppuraj FC	2–3	SC Goa
Rajaganapathy 21'; Jijo 39'	Report	Ll. Cardozo 22', 38'; Totad 23'

KD Jadhav Indoor Hall, New Delhi
Attendance: 30
Referee: Syed Khaleel, Vishal Vaja
7 November 2021
19:30

Speed Force FC	2–9	Bengaluru FC
Sultan 21'; Hussain 28'	Report	Nickson 9'; Chaudhary 10', 40'; Venkatesh 21', 31'; Oram 33'; Vanlalhruaitluanga 34'; Fanai 35'; Yadav 37'

KD Jadhav Indoor Hall, New Delhi
Attendance: 40
Referee: Priyobarta Singh, Clinton Pacheco

9 November 2021
17:00

Bengaluru FC	2–3	Kuppuraj FC
Nambrath 26'; Oram 32'	Report	Vivek 13', 33'; Rajaganapathy 36'

KD Jadhav Indoor Hall, New Delhi
Attendance: 50
Referee: Clinton Pacheco, Ashirbad Kanungo
9 November 2021
19:30

Speed Force FC	5–8	SC Goa
Sultan 11'; Dayma 13'; F. Khan 23'; Ali 28'; Waseuddin 33'	Report	Totad 1', 6', 22', 38'; Ll. Cardozo 14', 21', 31'; Lahmadi 17' (o.g.)

KD Jadhav Indoor Hall, New Delhi
Attendance: 50
Referee: Ajay Singh, Tanveer Ahmed

=== Group C ===
Pos	Team	Pld	W	D	L	GF	GA	GD	Pts	Qualification
1	Delhi FC	3	3	0	0	44	11	+33	9	Knockout stage
2	Niaw Wasa F.C.	3	1	1	1	14	19	−5	4	
3	Telongjem FC	3	1	0	2	20	31	−11	3	
4	TRAU	3	0	1	2	10	27	−17	1	

Source: AIFF
6 November 2021
12:00

Telongjem	6–16	Delhi FC
Kaurinta 4'; P. Sunep 5', 7', 23'; Assumi 8'; Yimjong 8'	Report	Mali 1', 16', 17', 34'; Lalpekhlua 3', 3', 23'; Lalremruata 14', 32'; Goyary 14', 33'; Mulchandani 23', 37'; Zaihmingthanga 26'; Bhui 37'; Hrahsel 38'

KD Jadhav Indoor Hall, New Delhi
Attendance: 120
Referee: Clinton Pacheco, Stanley Jones
6 November 2021
14:30

Niaw Wasa F.C.	2–2	TRAU
Khongmalai 25' (pen.), 35'	Report	Laishram 24', 30'

KD Jadhav Indoor Hall, New Delhi
Attendance: 50
Referee: Ashirbad Kanungo, K. Vihokhe

8 November 2021
12:00

Telongjem FC	2–8	Niaw Wasa F.C.
M. Sunep 4'; P. Sunep 8'	Report	Sumer 7'; Ryngkhlem 8'; Lamat 13', 17', 26'; Jat 25'; Nongrum 29', 37'

KD Jadhav Indoor Hall, New Delhi
Attendance: 40
Referee: Shyamson Chongtham, Surendiran K.
8 November 2021
14:30

Delhi FC	13–1	TRAU
Mali 12', 14', 25', 36', 39'; Lalpekhlua 17', 22'; Mulchandani 19'; Khyriem 20'; Naorem 28'; Lalremruata 35', 37'; Bhandari 40'	Report	Laishram 5'

KD Jadhav Indoor Hall, New Delhi
Attendance: 50
Referee: Ajay Singh, K. Vihokhe

10 November 2021
12:00

TRAU	7–12	Telongjem FC
Nongthombam 6'; Samte 14', 21', 27'; Laishram 15'; Imkongwati 30' (o.g.); Elangbam 40'	Report	P. Sunep 7', 30', 32', 33'; Yimjong 17', 19', 24', 28', 38'; Sakutemjen 14'; Imkongwati 20'; Reiyang 25'

KD Jadhav Indoor Hall, New Delhi
Attendance: 30
Referee: Surendiran K., Stanley Jones
10 November 2021
14:30

Delhi FC	15–4	Niaw Wasa F.C.
Mulchandani 6'; Lalpekhlua 10', 21', 31'; Mali 23', 34', 37', 37', 39'; Goyary 30', 38'; Bhandari 32', 38'; Lalremruata 34'; Zomuanpuia 34'	Report	Lamat 10', 37'; Jat 15'; Khongmalai 20'

KD Jadhav Indoor Hall, New Delhi
Attendance: 100
Referee: Priyobarta Singh, Clinton Pacheco

=== Group D ===
Pos	Team	Pld	W	D	L	GF	GA	GD	Pts	Qualification
1	Mangala Club	3	3	0	0	29	10	+19	9	Knockout stage
2	Classic FA	3	2	0	1	25	7	+18	6	
3	Sudeva Delhi	3	1	0	2	13	16	−3	3	
4	Real Kashmir	3	0	0	3	8	42	−34	0	

Source: AIFF
Rules for classification: Group stage tiebreakers
6 November 2021
17:00

Real Kashmir	0–15	Classic FA
	Report	Malangmei 4', 8', 11', 15', 16'; Meitei 12', 17', 35', 36', 39'; Keishing 13', 32', 39'; Worneilen 19'; Hanief 34' (o.g.)

KD Jadhav Indoor Hall, New Delhi
Attendance: 40
Referee: Kisstarlin Wanniang, Deeptesh Rakshit
6 November 2021
19:30

Mangala Club	5–3	Sudeva Delhi
Das 4', 10', 37'; Ralte 8' (o.g.); B. Rout 23'	Report	Oinam 5', 10'; Gangte 28'

KD Jadhav Indoor Hall, New Delhi
Attendance: 50
Referee: Jeffrey Shabong, Surendiran K.

8 November 2021
17:00

Real Kashmir	3–18	Mangala Club
Sunder 13', 28'; Parray 36'	Report	B. Rout 3', 9', 28', 28', 31', 32'; Das 4', 13', 26', 28', 33', 37', 38', 39'; Barik 25', 39'; Behera 29', 32'

KD Jadhav Indoor Hall, New Delhi
Attendance: 40
Referee: Anshul Dixit, Deeptesh Rakshit
8 November 2021
19:30

Classic FA	6–1	Sudeva Delhi
Oinam 3' (o.g.); Sorokhaibam 7'; Keishing 15'; Worneilen 17'; Malangmei 28', 30'	Report	Thingujam 29'

KD Jadhav Indoor Hall, New Delhi
Attendance: 50
Referee: Kisstarlin Wanniang, Vishal Vaja

10 November 2021
17:00

Sudeva Delhi	9–5	Real Kashmir
Thingujam 2', 7'; Oinam 2', 7'; Lamlallian 6', 31'; Nongmeikapam 25'; Gangte 26', 27'	Report	Parray 6', 38', 39'; Hanief 17'; Sunder 24'

KD Jadhav Indoor Hall, New Delhi
Attendance: 40
Referee: Jeffrey Shabong, Ashirbad Kanungo
10 November 2021
19:30

Classic FA	4–6	Mangala Club
Malangmei 4', 11', 18'; Chungkham 25'	Report	Bindhani 17'; B. Rout 20', 21', 36'; Das 28', 32'

KD Jadhav Indoor Hall, New Delhi
Attendance: 30
Referee: Ajay Singh, Kisstarlin Wanniang

== Knock-out stage ==
=== Bracket ===
Semi-finals
Mohammedan SC	2
Bengaluru FC	0
Delhi FC	12
Mangala Club	7

Final
Mohammedan SC	2
Delhi FC	7

=== Semi-final ===
12 November 2021
17:00

Mohammedan SC	2–0	Bengaluru FC
Sutar 31'; Malpote 35'	Report

KD Jadhav Indoor Hall, New Delhi
Attendance: 40
Referee: Priyobarta Singh, Kisstarlin Wanniang
12 November 2021
19:30

Delhi FC	12–7	Mangala Club
Mali 1', 4', 12' (pen.), 32'; Temuri 8', 34'; Lalpekhlua 13', 15'; Bhandari 16'; Lalremruata 33'; Goyary 38'; Naorem 39'	Report	B. Rout 20'; Behera 28'; Zomuanpuia 32' (o.g.); Das 36', 38', 38', 39'

KD Jadhav Indoor Hall, New Delhi
Attendance: 100
Referee: Clinton Pacheco, Ajay Singh

=== Final ===
13 November 2021
20:30

Mohammedan SC	2–7	Delhi FC
Sutar 12'; Medeira 34'	Report	Lalpekhlua 3'; Mali 16', 27', 33', 34' (pen.), 39'; Mulchandani 25'

KD Jadhav Indoor Hall, New Delhi
Attendance: 200
Referee: Kisstarlin Wanniang, Ajay Singh

== Top scorers ==
Rank	Player	Team	Goals
1	(India) Nikhil Mali	Delhi FC	24
2	(India) Dinabandhu Das	Mangala Club	17
3	(India) Lalpekhlua	Delhi FC	11
3	(India) Babul Kumar Rout	Mangala Club	11
5	(India) Ganningam Malangmei	Classic FA	10
6	(India) Pursunep	Telongjem	8
7	(India) Ibrahim Ali	Speed Force FC	7
