= Mohammedan SC (futsal) =

Indian futsal club

Mohammedan SC Futsal
- Full name: Mohammedan Sporting Club Futsal
- Nickname: The Black Panthers
- Short name: MSC
- Founded: 22 February 1891; 134 years ago (Mohammedan SC); 2005; 20 years ago (Mohammedan SC Futsal)
- Ground: Netaji Indoor Stadium
- Capacity: 12,000
- Owners: Mohammedan Sporting Club Private Limited (50%); Bunkerhill Private Limited (50%)
- President: Gulam Ashraf
- League: IFA Futsal Championship; Futsal Club Championship
Home colours	Away colours	Third colours

Mohammedan Sporting Club Futsal is a professional futsal club based in Kolkata, India. It is the section of over a century old multi-sports club Mohammedan SC.

Originally Mohammedan begun to play futsal in 2005 for an exhibition tournament organised by IFA (W.B.). Later, the club's separated section was formally founded in 2021 and played in the Futsal Club Championship, India's top tier futsal league.

== History ==
=== 2005 ===
The IFA had organised Kolkata Futsal Championship in 2005 with 320 teams participating, to introduce the sport in West Bengal. Mohammedan SC decided to create a futsal club to participate in the tournament. After the end of the tournament, the club was discontinued.

=== 2016 ===
The IFA organised another futsal tournament, Kolkata Futsal League in 2016, in order to further promote the sport in the state. Mohammedan SC decided reinstate the futsal club. The league was played among 8 clubs as a single-elimination tournament. Mohammedan got knocked-out from the tournament in its first match against Southern Samity. The club was once again discontinued due to lack of competitions to participate in.

=== 2020–present ===
After the announcement of a national-level futsal league by AIFF, Mohammedan SC came forward to re-establish its futsal club and participate in the tournament, with the goal of winning it and eventually participating in the AFC Futsal Club Championship. It was supposed to commence in 2020, but due to COVID-19 pandemic, the tournament was rescheduled for 2021. The club signed Joshuah Vaz and Mihir Sawant, to play along with being the head coach and the goalkeeping coach respectively. Mohammedan played its first official match on November 5 against Baroda FC at KD Jadhav Hall in New Delhi. They won the match by 0–9, with Sandesh Malpote, Sachin Patil, Rui Carlo, Hilton Fernandes, Filbert Pereira and Joshuah Vaz scoring. Rui Carlo, aged 15, was the youngest player in the tournament. They became the first team to reach the league finals by defeating Bengaluru FC in the semi-final, but eventually Mohammedan lost the inaugural season final to Delhi FC by 2–7.

== Recent seasons ==
As of November 2023

Season	Group stage						Playoff
Season	Pl	W	D	L	GD	Pos	Playoff
2021	3	3	0	0	+14	1st of 4	Runners-up
2023	6	4	1	1	+13	2nd of 7	Runners-up

== Technical staff ==
Position	Name
Head coach	
Team manager	(India) Belal Ahmed Khan
Fitness coach	(India) Ravinder Singh Chauhan
Physio	(India) Ankan Roychowdhury (India) Akhilesh KS

== Honours ==
=== Domestic ===
- Futsal Club Championship
  - Runners-up (2): 2021–22, 2022–23
- IFA Futsal Championship
  - Winners (1): 2022

== See also ==
- Mohammedan SC (Women's)
