= Sudeva Delhi Futsal =

Indian futsal club

Sudeva Delhi FC
- Full name: Sudeva Delhi Futsal Club
- Founded: 2014; 11 years ago (Sudeva Moonlight FC); 2021; 4 years ago (Sudeva Delhi Futsal Club)
- Ground: Indira Gandhi Arena
- Capacity: 14,348
- Owner: Anuj Gupta; Vijay Hakari
- League: FD Futsal League
- Website: http://www.sudeva.in/
Home colours	Away colours

Sudeva Delhi Futsal is an Indian professional futsal club which is part of Sudeva Delhi FC, based in Delhi. The club competes in FD Futsal League and earlier in the Futsal Club Championship, the highest level of futsal club competition in India.

== Recent seasons ==
As of November 2021

Season	Tier	Division	Result
2021	1	FCC	Group stage, 3rd
