= Gujarat Super League =

Association football league in India

- Organising body: Gujarat State Football Association
- Founded: 2024; 2 years ago
- Country: India
- Number of clubs: 6
- Current champions: Saurashtra Spartans (1st title)
- Broadcaster: GSFA (YouTube)
- Website: GSL
- Current: 2026 Gujarat Super League

The Gujarat Super League is a men's franchise football league in the state of Gujarat, organized by the Gujarat State Football Association. The competition consisted of 6 teams in the initial season. All the matches are hosted at EKA Arena in Ahmedabad.

== Format ==
It is held in a single round-robin format, with the top two teams at the end of the league stage contesting the final.

The players will be selected by draft. In the inaugural draft, 250 players from Gujarat will be included.

== Teams ==
Locations of the GSL teams

Team	City	Owner
Ahmedabad Avengers	Ahmedabad	God TMT, VIVAN Steel
Gandhinagar Giants	Gandhinagar	Ratnamani Metals & Tubes, ANVI Sports
Karnavati Knights	Ahmedabad	The Address
Saurashtra Spartans	Rajkot	Axita Cotton
Surat Strikers	Surat	Loyal Equipments
Vadodara Warriors	Vadodara	K&D Communication

== Results ==
Season	Champions	Runners-up	No. of teams
2024	Karnavati Knights	Vadodara Warriors	6
2025	Vadodara Warriors	Ahmedabad Avengers	6
2026	Saurashtra Spartans	Ahmedabad Avengers	6

== Sponsorship ==
Tourism Corporation of Gujarat Limited (TCGL) and the Sports Authority of Gujarat (SAG) are the main and associate sponsors of the GSL, respectively.

== Management (2025) ==
Team	Head coach	Assistant coach	Team manager	Physio
Ahmedabad Avengers	Tapas Ghosh	Ashish Sadhu	Kshitij Jain	Haresh Prajapati
Gandhinagar Giants	Shakti Chauhan	Kamlesh Maradia	Gulab Singh	Pritesh Ankleshvariya
Karnavati Knights	Dharmesh Patel	Llewellyn Pinto	Dhaval Parmar	Aniket Solanki
Saurashtra Spartans	Anil Patel	Anil Tomar	Naren Trivedi	Chintan Jain
Surat Strikers	Balpreet Singh	Antrix Patel	Hardip Majirana	Anil Kewat
Vadodara Warriors	Salim Pathan	Darshansinh Raol	Savio D’Costa	Arth Joshi

== Awards ==
The champions of the GSL will receive a prize money of ₹11 lakhs, while the runners-up will receive ₹5 lakhs. Individually, the best players in eight different categories will get a prize money of ₹25,000 each on the basis of their performance throughout the tournament.

== Broadcasting ==
After the Santosh Trophy, the GSL became the second Indian football tournament to be streamed globally on FIFA+. It was also streamed on GSFA official YouTube channel.

== See also ==
- Gujarat SFA Club Championship
- Kerala Super League
