= 2024 Gujarat Super League =

Tournament details
- Country: India
- Venue(s): EKA Arena, Ahmedabad
- Dates: 1 – 12 May
- Teams: 6

Final positions
- Champions: Karnavati Knights
- Runners-up: Vadodara Warriors

Tournament statistics
- Matches played: 16

The 2024 Gujarat Super League was the first edition of the Gujarat Super League. Karnavati Knights became the champions of the inaugural season.

== Format ==
The tournament proper will feature 6 clubs across 5 cities of Gujarat. The 6 clubs will play each other in a single round-robin format, with the top two teams at the end of the league stage contesting the final.

== Teams ==
Locations of the GSL clubs

| Team | City |
|---|---|
| Ahmedabad Avengers | Ahmedabad |
| Gandhinagar Giants | Gandhinagar |
| Karnavati Knights | Ahmedabad |
| Saurashtra Spartans | Saurashtra |
| Surat Strikers | Surat |
| Vadodara Warriors | Vadodara |

== Venues ==
The matches are planned to be held in EKA Arena.

Ahmedabad
EKA Arena
Capacity: 20,000
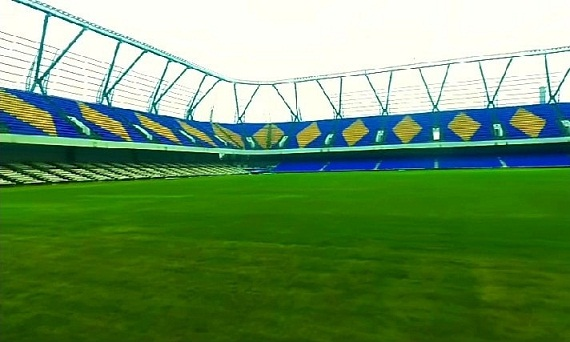

== Non-Gujarati players ==
| Team | Player 1 | Player 2 | Player 3 | Player 4 |
|---|---|---|---|---|
| Ahmedabad Avengers | HP Lalremruta | Angelo Singh Kesam | K. Lalrutdika | |
| Gandhinagar Giants | FC Lalhmunmawia | Vincent Lalduhawma | | |
| Karnavati Knights | Yash Shukla | | | |
| Saurashtra Spartans | Manvir Singh | Mohd Rizwan | Tagru Jaes | |
| Surat Strikers | Tarhdolu | Lalengmawia | Stanley Peter | |
| Vadodara Warriors | Jigyas Deka | Nikhil Deka | Dhruv Sharma | Juwel Ahmed |

== Standings ==
| Pos | Team | Pld | W | D | L | GF | GA | GD | Pts | |
|---|---|---|---|---|---|---|---|---|---|---|
| 1 | Karnavati Knights | 5 | 3 | 2 | 0 | 8 | 4 | +4 | 11 | Advanced to Finals |
| 2 | Vadodara Warriors | 5 | 3 | 1 | 1 | 9 | 6 | +3 | 10 | Advanced to Finals |
| 3 | Ahmedabad Avengers | 5 | 3 | 0 | 2 | 11 | 8 | +3 | 9 | |
| 4 | Saurashtra Spartans | 5 | 3 | 0 | 2 | 6 | 7 | −1 | 9 | |
| 5 | Gandhinagar Giants | 5 | 1 | 0 | 4 | 4 | 6 | −2 | 3 | |
| 6 | Surat Strikers | 5 | 0 | 1 | 4 | 1 | 8 | −7 | 1 | |

Updated to match(es) played on 08 May 2024. Source: GSFA

== Matches ==
1 May 2024
19:00

| Ahmedabad Avengers | 2–0 | Surat Strikers |
|---|---|---|
| Brajesh Yadav 67'; Keisam Angelo Singh 86' | Report |

EKA Arena, Ahmedabad
Attendance: 1256
1 May 2024
21:30

| Gandhinagar Giants | 0–1 | Vadodara Warriors |
|---|---|---|
| | Report | Tagru James 61' |

EKA Arena, Ahmedabad
Attendance: 786

2 May 2024
19:00

| Karnavati Knights | 3–1 | Saurashtra Spartans |
|---|---|---|
| Pratik Swami 8'; Ramsinghbhai Rathwa 57'; Vishesh Pandey 88' | Report | Moinuddin 36' |

EKA Arena, Ahmedabad
Attendance: 1300

4 May 2024
16:30

| Ahmedabad Avengers | 1–0 | Gandhinagar Giants |
|---|---|---|
| Jay Kanani 51' | Report |

EKA Arena, Ahmedabad
Attendance: 550
4 May 2024
19:00

| Surat Strikers | 0–0 | Karnavati Knights |
|---|---|---|
| | Report |

EKA Arena, Ahmedabad
Attendance: 1230
4 May 2024
21:30

| Vadodara Warriors | 0–1 | Saurashtra Spartans |
|---|---|---|
| | Report | Jenish Rana (OG) 73' |

EKA Arena, Ahmedabad
Attendance: 1350

5 May 2024
16:30

| Surat Strikers | 0–1 | Saurashtra Spartans |
|---|---|---|
| | Report | Zidan Momin 64' |

EKA Arena, Ahmedabad
Attendance: 650
5 May 2024
19:00

| Ahmedabad Avengers | 3–5 | Vadodara Warriors |
|---|---|---|
| Akshay Mall 33', 45+4', 79' | Report | Tagru James 45+2', 75', 90+1'; Manvir Singh 38', 45+4' |

EKA Arena, Ahmedabad
Attendance: 970
5 May 2024
21:30

| Gandhinagar Giants | 0–1 | Karnavati Knights |
|---|---|---|
| | Report | Kuldeep Thakor 79' (pen.) |

EKA Arena, Ahmedabad
Attendance: 1200

8 May 2024
16:30

| Gandhinagar Giants | 1–3 | Saurashtra Spartans |
|---|---|---|
| Marufmulla 22' | Report | Rudra Jadeja 26' (o.g.); Dhruv Sharma 61'; Jignesh Parmar 82' |

EKA Arena, Ahmedabad
Attendance: 750
8 May 2024
19:00

| Ahmedabad Avengers | 2–3 | Karnavati Knights |
|---|---|---|
| Akshay Mall 13'; Manav Vyas 19' | Report | Kamlesh 4'; Irfan Abbasi 26'; Kuldeep Thakor 90' |

EKA Arena, Ahmedabad
Attendance: 876
8 May 2024
21:30

| Surat Strikers | 1–2 | Vadodara Warriors |
|---|---|---|
| Bariam Chun 65' | Report | Manvir Singh 20', 90+2' (pen.) |

EKA Arena, Ahmedabad
Attendance: 950

10 May 2024
16:30

| Vadodara Warriors | 1–1 | Karnavati Knights |

EKA Arena, Ahmedabad
10 May 2024
19:00

| Ahmedabad Avengers | 3–0 | Saurashtra Spartans |

EKA Arena, Ahmedabad
10 May 2024
21:30

| Surat Strikers | 0–3 | Gandhinagar Giants |

EKA Arena, Ahmedabad

== Final ==
12 May 2024
19:00
Final

| Karnavati Knights | 1–1 | Vadodara Warriors |
|---|---|---|
| | Report |
Penalties
| | 5–3 |

EKA Arena, Ahmedabad
Attendance: 5618

== Top scorers ==
| Rank | Player | Club | Goals |
|---|---|---|---|
| 1 | | | |
| 2 | | | |
| 3 | | | |
| 4 | | | |
| 5 | | | |

== Awards ==
| Award | Winner | Club | Prize |
|---|---|---|---|
| Category 1 | | | ₹ 25,000 |
| Category 2 | | | ₹ 25,000 |
| Category 3 | | | ₹ 25,000 |
| Category 4 | | | ₹ 25,000 |
| Category 5 | | | ₹ 25,000 |
| Category 6 | | | ₹ 25,000 |
| Category 7 | | | ₹ 25,000 |
| Category 8 | | | ₹ 25,000 |
| Runners-up | Vadodara Warriors | | ₹ 5,00,000 |
| Champions | Karnavati Knights | | ₹ 11,00,000 |
Source: GSL

== Sponsorship ==
| Category | Name |
|---|---|
| Title Sponsor | Gujarat Tourism |
| Associate Sponsor | Sports Authority of Gujarat |
| Medical Partner | KD Hospital |
| Performance Partner | Footrax |
| Physiotheraphy Partner | Swift Health Solution |
| Kit & Equipment Partner | Nivia |
| Venue Partner | EKA Arena |

== Broadcasting ==
After the Santosh Trophy, the GSL will become the second Indian football tournament to be streamed globally on FIFA+.

| Territory | Broadcaster(s) | Ref. |
|---|---|---|
| India | GSFA (YouTube) | |
| India | FIFA+ | |
| (United Nations) Global | FIFA+ | |
