= 2022–23 Bangladesh Women's Super League =

Bangladesh Women's Super League
- Season: 2022–23

The 2022–23 Bangladesh Women's Super League (BWSL) was the proposed inaugural season of the Bangladesh Women's Super League, a women's franchise football league in Bangladesh. The league was to take place from 10 June to 22 June 2023 with four teams participating in the league.

== Venues ==
The all matches will be played following these two grounds.

Dhaka	Sylhet
Bashundhara Kings Arena	Sylhet District Stadium
Capacity: 14,000	Capacity: 15,000
2022–23 Bangladesh Women's Super League is located in Bangladesh

== Teams ==
Team	Location	Head Coach	Captain
TBC	New delhi		
TBC	Kerala		
TBC	Cambodia		
TBC	Laos		

== Foreign players ==
Team	Player 1	Player 2	Player 3	Player 4
TBC				
TBC				
TBC				
TBC				

== Standings ==
=== League table ===
Pos	Team	Pld	W	D	L	GF	GA	GD	Pts	Qualification
1	A1	0	0	0	0	0	0	0	0	Champion
2	A2	0	0	0	0	0	0	0	0	
3	A3	0	0	0	0	0	0	0	0	
4	A4	0	0	0	0	0	0	0	0	

First match(es) will be played: 22 May 2023. Source:
