= 2022–23 Futsal Club Championship =

Second edition of Hero Futsal Club Championship

2022–23 Hero Futsal Club Championship
Tournament details
- Country: India
- City: New Delhi
- Venue(s): K. D. Jadhav Indoor Hall, Indira Gandhi Arena
- Dates: 8–19 February 2023
- Teams: 14

Final positions
- Champions: Minerva Academy FC (1st title)
- Runners-up: Mohammedan

Tournament statistics
- Matches played: 45
- Goals scored: 519 (11.53 per match)
- Top goal scorer(s): Nikhil Mali (25 goals)

Awards
- Best player: Nikhil Mali

The 2022–23 Futsal Club Championship was the 2nd edition of the Futsal Club Championship, an annual futsal club tournament in India organised by the All India Football Federation (AIFF), held in New Delhi.

== Format ==
The Futsal Club Championship 2022–23 features a total of 14 teams, who were divided into two groups, and play in a round-robin format. The semi-final stage is played in a knockout format between the top four group stage teams.

== Teams ==
The following 14 teams participated.

Locations of Hero Futsal Club Championship teams

Team	City/State
Bengaluru FC	Bengaluru, Karnataka
BPSS FC	Bengaluru, Karnataka
Delhi FC	Delhi
Goal Hunterz FC	Delhi
Minerva Academy FC	Mohali, Punjab
Sports Odisha	Bhubaneswar, Odisha
Electric Veng Futsal Club	Aizawl, Mizoram
Dzawo FC	Ladakh
Techtro Swades United FC	Una, Himachal Pradesh
Speed Force FC	Telangana
Mohammedan SC	Kolkata, West Bengal
Capital Complex FC	Itanagar, Arunachal Pradesh
Aphuyemi FC	Pughoboto, Nagaland
Juggernaut FC	Ahmedabad, Gujarat

== Group stage ==
=== Group A ===
Pos	Team	Pld	W	D	L	GF	GA	GD	Pts	Qualification
1	Delhi FC	6	6	0	0	71	22	+49	18	Advanced to Knockout stage
2	Electric Veng Futsal Club	6	4	0	2	37	32	+5	12	Advanced to Knockout stage
3	Speed Force FC	6	4	0	2	44	31	+13	12	
4	Bengaluru FC	6	3	0	3	25	24	+1	9	
5	Sports Odisha	6	2	0	4	20	43	−23	6	
6	Techtro Swades United FC	6	2	0	4	33	30	+3	6	
7	Dzawo 11 FC	6	0	0	6	13	61	−48	0	

Source: AIFF

=== Group B ===
Pos	Team	Pld	W	D	L	GF	GA	GD	Pts	Qualification
1	Minerva Academy FC	6	5	0	1	53	20	+33	15	Advanced to Knockout stage
2	Mohammedan	6	4	1	1	33	20	+13	13	Advanced to Knockout stage
3	Juggernaut FC	6	3	2	1	28	19	+9	11	
4	Goal Hunterz FC	6	2	2	2	34	30	+4	8	
5	Capital Complex FC	6	2	2	2	37	45	−8	8	
6	BPSS FC	6	1	1	4	35	48	−13	4	
7	Aphuyemi Football Club	6	0	0	6	18	56	−38	0	

Source: AIFF

== Knockout stage ==
=== Bracket ===
Semi-finals
18 February
Delhi FC	6
Mohammedan	7
18 February
Minerva Academy FC	13
Electric Veng Futsal Club	8

Final
19 February
Mohammedan	2 (1)
Minerva Academy FC	2 (3)

=== Semi-finals ===
18 February 2023
16:30 IST

Delhi FC	6–7	Mohammedan
K Roluahpuia 9', 27'; David Laltlansanga 19'; Jojo Zaihmingthanga 20', 37'; George Ms Dawngliana 29'	Report	Sandeep Oraw 2', 28', 35'; Shamsad Ali 4'; Suvo Khatoora 7', 13', 18'

KD Jadhav Indoor Hall

18 February 2023
19:30 IST

Minerva Academy FC	13–8	Electric Veng Futsal Club
Nikhil Mali 1', 9', 13', 14', 33'; Jayesh Sutar 1'; Clinton Rosario D'souza 17'; Thingnam Radhakanta Singh 30', 31', 36'; Craig Hermete D'souza 36'; Rugved Ajay Yeole 37'; Joel Beckham Simon 38'	Report	Lalrinsanga Khawlhring 13', 23', 39'; Samuel Lawmsiamkima 14', 25'; Jonathan Lalrawngbawla 25', 35'; Lalsangkima 36'

KD Jadhav Indoor Hall

=== Final ===
19 February 2023
19:30 IST

Mohammedan	2–2	Minerva Academy FC
Suvo Khatoora 14'; Sandeep Oraw 32'	Report	Clinton Rosario D'souza 19'; Thingnam Radhakanta Singh 23'
Penalties
	1–3

KD Jadhav Indoor Hall

== Top scorers ==
Rank	Player	Team	Goals
1	(India) Nikhil Mali	Minerva Academy FC	25
2	(India) K Roluahpuia	Delhi FC	17
3	(India) Mohammed Ahtesham Ali	Speed Force FC	15
4	(India) Gwgwmsar Gayary	Delhi FC	14
5	(India) Ibrahim Ali	Speed Force FC	13

== See also ==
- 2022–23 Santosh Trophy
- 2023 National Beach Soccer Championship
