= Bengaluru FC Futsal =

Indian futsal club

- Full name: Bengaluru FC Futsal
- Nickname: The Blues
- Short name: BFC
- Founded: 15 October 2021; 4 years ago
- Ground: Sree Kanteerava Indoor Stadium
- Capacity: 4,000
- Owner: JSW Group
- Chairman: Sajjan Jindal
- League: Karnataka Futsal League; Futsal Club Championship
- 2021: Semi-finalists
- Website: http://www.bengalurufc.com/
Home colours	Away colours	Third colours

Bengaluru FC Futsal is an Indian professional futsal club which is part of Bengaluru FC and is based in Bengaluru, Karnataka. The club competes in Karnataka Futsal League and Futsal Club Championship, the highest level of futsal club competition in India.

== History ==
In December 2019, the AIFF executive committee had announced that a new futsal club tournament will be held annually and had also invited ISL clubs to participate., but due to COVID pandemic the tournament was postponed and rescheduled for 2021. On 15 October 2021, Bengaluru FC emerged as the only ISL club to have announced participation.

== Recent seasons ==
As of February 2023

Season	Tier	Division	Result
2021	1	FCC	Semi-final
2022–23	1	FCC	Group Stage

== Squad ==
As of 3 November 2021

Bengaluru FC had announced 18-man squad for their inaugural campaign at AIFF Futsal Club Championship.

Note: Flags indicate national team as defined under FIFA eligibility rules; some limited exceptions apply. Players may hold more than one non-FIFA nationality.

No.	Pos.	Nation	Player
—		IND	Manik Baliyan
—		IND	Pretam Harash Idnani
—		IND	Manish Chaudhary
—		IND	Robin Yadav
—		IND	Harpreet Singh
—		IND	Jagdeep Singh
—		IND	Shigil NS
—		IND	Bekey Oram
—		IND	Kamalesh Palanisamy

No.	Pos.	Nation	Player
—		IND	Edwin Rosario
—		IND	Louis Macarton Nickson
—		IND	Lalthangliana
—		IND	Vinith V.
—		IND	Omega Vanlalhruaitluanga
—		IND	Lalremtluanga Fanai
—		IND	Biswa Darjee
—		IND	Nongkhlaw Emboklang
—		IND	Monirul Molla

== See also ==
- Bengaluru FC Reserves and Academy
