= Netaji Subhas University of Sports and Entrepreneurship =

Proposed university in West Bengal, India

The Netaji Subhas University of Sports and Entrepreneurship is India’s first proposed private sports university in Chuchura, Hooghly district, West Bengal, India. Approved by the West Bengal Legislative Assembly in June 2025. The university was established under the Netaji Subhas University of Sports and Entrepreneurship Act, 2025. The university is part of the state’s efforts to enhance higher education infrastructure and sports opportunities.

== Overview ==
The university is named after Subhas Chandra Bose, the Indian nationalist leader. It will offer education in sports science, performance analytics, physiotherapy, nutrition, sports law, management and coaching. The university will collaborate with sports organisations, including the Indian Olympic Association (IOA), All India Football Federation (AIFF) among others.
