= Bangladesh Women's Super League =

Bangladeshi Women's professional football league

- Organising body: Bangladesh Football Federation (BFF)
- Founded: 13 March 2023; 3 years ago
- Country: Bangladesh
- Confederation: AFC
- Number of clubs: 4
- Current: 2022–23

The Bangladesh Women's Super League (BWSL) is the proposed women's professional franchise football league in Bangladesh. Founded in 2023, a total of 4 teams from across the country were to participate in the league's inaugural season.

== Champions ==
=== Successful clubs by seasons ===
Edition	Season	Champions	Runners–up
1st	2022–23		

== Stats and players ==
=== Seasonal statistics ===
Season	Total Goals	Matches played	Average per Game
2022–23			

=== Top scorers ===
Year	Player	Club	Goals
2022–23			
