= Joshuah Vaz =

Indian former footballer

Personal information
- Full name: Joshuah Stan Vaz
- Date of birth: 5 August 1990 (age 36)
- Place of birth: Goa, India
- Position: Midfielder

Youth career
- Dempo

Senior career*
Years	Team	Apps	(Gls)
2007–2010	Dempo		
2010	Salcete		
2010–2011	Churchill Brothers		
2011–2013	Goa Velha		
2014	Panjim Footballers		
2014–2016	Santa Cruz Club of Cavellosim		
2016–2018	Churchill Brothers		
2018–2019	Santa Cruz Club of Cavellosim		

Managerial career
- 2021–2024: Mohammedan (futsal)
- 2023–2025: India (futsal)
- 2024: Golazo FC (futsal)
- 2024–: India women (futsal)
- 2025: Bhawanipore Club (futsal)
- 2026–: Tlangnuam Futsal Club
- * Club domestic league appearances and goals

Joshuah Vaz (born 5 August 1990) is an Indian former professional footballer who played as a midfielder. He is also a former futsal player and currently the head coach of the India women's national futsal team.

== Club career ==
Born in Goa, Vaz began his career in the youth ranks of Dempo. He participated with the club's first-team in the Goa Professional League before getting called into the side's I-League squad in 2008. In September 2007 it was reported that Vaz would be sent to Portuguese club Vitória Guimarães for training. Vaz stayed with the club until 2010 before moving to local division side Salcete. After spending some time with Salcete, Vaz joined Churchill Brothers where he spent a season before moving back to local football with Goa Velha.

After playing a couple of seasons with Goa Velha, Vaz joined Goan second division side Panjim Footballers in order to gain match fitness after an injury. He spent one season with Panjim before moving to Goa Pro League side Santa Cruz Club of Cavellosim.

Prior to the 2016–17 I-League season, Vaz rejoined Churchill Brothers. He would go on to make his professional debut in the league the next season on 10 December 2017 against Mohun Bagan. He started and played 70 minutes as Churchill Brothers were defeated 5–0.

At the end of the 2017–18 season, Vaz left Churchill Brothers and returned to Santa Cruz Club of Cavellosim.

== Personal life ==
Vaz is the co-owner of a Futsal Academy in Goa called YFA. His father was one of the first people to attend a futsal level 1 course that was conducted in Kolkata for the first time in 2010. With the same knowledge Mr. Socorro Vaz (father of Joshuah Vaz) started this academy to train children at the grassroot level. It has been 12 years since the conception of YFA still runs with full focus to develop young budding talents and to foster love for the game. The academy has their teams participating for every grassroot tournament held in Goa from ages 6 to17. He also has a brother, Charlton, who also played at Dempo.

== Professional statistics ==
As of match played 15 January 2018

Appearances and goals by club, season and competition
Club	Season	League			Cup		Continental		Total	
Club	Season	Division	Apps	Goals	Apps	Goals	Apps	Goals	Apps	Goals
Churchill Brothers	2017–18	I-League	4	0	—	—	—	—	4	0
Career total			4	0	0	0	0	0	4	0
