= Corbett FC =

Indian association football club based in Uttarakhand

Corbett
- Full name: Corbett Football Club Uttarakhand
- Founded: 2013; 13 years ago (as Amenity Sports Academy); 2020; 6 years ago (as Corbett Football Club)
- Ground: Amenity Sport Academy Ground
- Capacity: 2,000
- Chairman: Subhash Arora
- League: Uttarakhand Super League
- Website: addsoccerschool.com
Home colours	Away colours	Third colours

Corbett Football Club (previously known as Amenity Sports Academy Football Club) is an Indian professional football club based in Rudrapur, Uttarakhand. The club currently competes in the Uttarakhand Super League, and has participated in both 2021 and 2022–23 I-League 2 qualifiers.

== History ==
Founded in 2013 as Amenity Sports Academy under Amenity Public School, the club was later functioning as Odisha FC academy branch. Its 2021 I-League qualifiers entry has been rather controversial because state association didn't conduct that year's qualifying tournament, directly nominating the club instead. They began their I-League Qualifiers journey with a 1–1 draw against ARA FC on 5 October at the Bangalore Football Stadium, eventually finishing group on 4th position.

== Kit manufacturers and shirt sponsors ==
Period	Kit manufacturer	Shirt sponsor
2021—present	Nivia	Amenity Sports Academy

== Other departments ==
=== Football: youth men's ===
Corbett's youth men's team competes in the Youth League. They took part in the group stages of 2022–23 U-17 Youth Cup. It's football academy gained an 'elite category' accreditation by the All India Football Federation in December 2023.

=== Futsal ===
The club operates futsal teams, and currently competing in the AIFF Futsal Club Championship.
