= Swarnim Gujarat Sports University =

Desar, Vadodara, Gujarat

- Type: Public
- Established: 2011; 15 years ago
- Affiliations: UGC
- Chairman: Ashwini Kumar, IAS
- Vice-Chancellor: Vacant
- Location: Desar, Vadodara district, Gujarat, 391774, India; 22.737459°N 73.3187715°E
- Campus: Suburban
- Website: sgsu.gujarat.gov.in

Swarnim Gujarat Sports University (SGSU) is a state University located in Desar Taluka, Vadodara district. It is a residential and affiliating university. It is second Sports University established by any State Government in India after the Tamil Nadu Physical Education and Sports University.

== Affiliated colleges ==
=== Grant-in-aid colleges ===
- Shri C. P. Degree College of Physical Education
- Degree College of Physical Education, Mahemdavad

=== Self-financed colleges ===
- S.S. Patel College of Physical Education
- V.J. Patel College of Physical Education
- Shri K.K Dharaiya B.P.Ed. College
- Dr. Subhash B.P.Ed. College
- L.J. Institutes of Sports Management
- L.J. Institutes of Event Management
