= Futsal Club Championship =

Futsal tournament for national clubs

- Organising body: All India Football Federation (AIFF)
- Founded: 2021; 5 years ago
- Country: India
- Confederation: AFC
- Number of clubs: 17
- Level on pyramid: 1
- International cup: AFC Futsal Club Championship
- Current champions: Tlangnuam (1st title)
- Most championships: Delhi; Minerva Academy; Corbett; Goal Hunterz; Tlangnuam (1 title each)
- Broadcaster(s): AIFF TV
- Website: the-aiff.com/futsal
- Current: 2025–26

The Futsal Club Championship is the highest level futsal club competition in India, organised by the All India Football Federation (AIFF). The inaugural edition kicked off on 5th November 2021 in New Delhi with 16 teams. It acts as possible qualifier for the AFC Futsal Club Championship, the highest level club futsal competition in Asia.

== History ==
On 10 December 2019, the AIFF executive committee decided that futsal club competition will be part of their calendar from 2020 season onwards. AIFF invited clubs playing Indian Super League, I-League and state level futsal champions to participate in the inaugural season. The inaugural championship was originally planned to be held in July – August, but due to COVID-19 pandemic, it was postponed until 2021.

== Competition format ==
=== 2021–22 ===
The inaugural edition featured a total of 16 teams, which have been divided into four groups, played in a round-robin format. The highest-placed team from each group makes it to the semi-final stage, played in a knockout format. The winners of the tournament become futsal champions of India.

=== 2022–23 ===
The second season had a total of 14 teams, divided into two groups of seven, where they play in the round robin format, before proceeding to the knockout rounds. The champion of the tournament would represent India at the AFC Futsal Club Championship.

== Champions ==
Season	Champions	Score	Runners-up
2021–22	Delhi	7–2	Mohammedan
2022–23	Minerva Academy	2–2 (3–1 p)	Mohammedan
2023–24	Corbett	3–2	Golazo
2024–25	Goal Hunterz	4–2	Bhawanipore
2025–26	Tlangnuam	9–5	Progressive Sports Academy

== Statistics and records ==
=== Final appearances ===
Team	Champion	Runner-up	Years won	Years runner-up
Delhi	1	–	2021–22	–
Minerva Academy	1	–	2022–23	–
Corbett	1	–	2023–24	–
Goal Hunterz	1	–	2024–25	–
Mohammedan	–	2	–	2021–22, 2022–23
Golazo	–	1	–	2023–24
Bhawanipore	–	1	–	2024–25
Tlangnuam	1	–	2025–26	–
Progressive Sports Academy	–	1	–	2025–26

== Media coverage ==
On 3rd November 2021, the All India Football Federation announced that Eurosport India will broadcast the inaugural edition of the Hero Futsal Club Championship.

== See also ==
- India national futsal team
- India women's national futsal team
- Football in India
- Sport in India
- History of Indian football
- Indian football league system
- AFC Futsal Asian Cup
- FIFA Futsal World Cup
- Asian Premier Futsal Championship
- Futsal Association of India
- Minifootball
- Five-a-side football
- Indoor soccer
