= 2015–16 Würzburger Kickers season =

Würzburger Kickers
2015–16 season
- Chairman: Dr. Michael Schlagbauer
- Manager: Bernd Hollerbach
- Stadium: flyeralarm Arena
- 3. Liga: 3rd
- DFB-Pokal: Round 1
- Bavarian Cup: Winner
- Top goalscorer: League: Elia Soriano (9 goals); All: Amir Shapourzadeh (14 goals)
- Highest home attendance: 9,011 vs. SG Dynamo Dresden, 1 August 2015
- Lowest home attendance: 3,301 vs. SV Wehen Wiesbaden, 12 December 2015
- Average home league attendance: 5,271

The 2015–16 Würzburger Kickers season is their 1st season in the 3. Liga.

== Transfers ==
=== In ===
No.	Pos.	Name	Age	EU	Moving from	Type	Transfer Window	Contract ends	Transfer fee	Ref.
1	GK	(Germany) Dominik Brunnhübner	24	Yes	SV Seligenporten	Transfer	Summer		Undisclosed	
4	MF	(Germany) Rico Benatelli	23	Yes	Erzgebirge Aue	Transfer	Summer	2017	Free	
10	MF	(Germany) Nejmeddin Daghfous	28	Yes	VfR Aalen	Transfer	Summer	2016		
11	MF	(Germany) Richard Weil	27	Yes	1. FSV Mainz 05 II	Transfer	Summer	2017	Undisclosed	
16	DF	(Germany) Peter Kurzweg	21	Yes	TSV 1860 München II	Transfer	Summer		Undisclosed	
17	FW	(Germany) Daniele Bruno	19	Yes	TSG 1899 Hoffenheim	Transfer	Summer	2017	Undisclosed	
19	GK	(Germany) Kenan Mujezinovic	20	Yes	VfB Stuttgart II	Transfer	Summer	2017	Undisclosed	
20	MF	(Hungary) Dániel Nagy	24	Yes	Ferencvárosi TC	Transfer	Summer	2017	Undisclosed	
22	DF	(Germany) Dennis Russ	23	Yes	SC Freiburg II	Transfer	Summer		Undisclosed	
25	DF	(Germany) Paweł Thomik	30	Yes	VfL Osnabrück	Transfer	Summer	2017	Undisclosed	
26	DF	(United States) Royal-Dominique Fennell	26	Yes	Stuttgarter Kickers	Transfer	Summer	2017	Undisclosed	
30	MF	(Germany) Emanuel Taffertshofer	20	Yes	TSV 1860 München	Transfer	Winter	2018	Undisclosed	
33	FW	(Italy) Elia Soriano	26	Yes	Stuttgarter Kickers	Transfer	Winter	2018	Undisclosed	

=== Out ===
No.	Pos.	Name	Age	EU	Moving to	Type	Transfer Window	Transfer fee	Ref.
	FW	(Germany) Daniel Diroll	23	Yes	1. FC Schweinfurt 05	Transfer	Summer	Undisclosed	
	MF	(Germany) Steven Lewerenz	24	Yes	Holstein Kiel	Transfer	Summer		
	MF	(Germany) Wojtek Droszcz	27	Yes	Würzburger FV	Transfer	Summer	Free	
	MF	(Germany) Fabian Weiß	23	Yes		Released	Winter		

== Friendlies ==
Win Draw Loss Postponed

Date	Kickoff^{1}	Venue	City	Opponent	Res.^{2}	Att.	Goalscorers		Ref.
Date	Kickoff^{1}	Venue	City	Opponent	Res.^{2}	Att.	Würzburger Kickers	Opponent	Ref.
22 June 2015	18:00		Wörgl	SK Austria Klagenfurt	0–0				
27 June 2015	17:00	A	Neunkirchen	SV Sandhausen	0–1			Wooten 80'	
28 June 2015	17:30		Randersacker	Rot-Weiss Essen	0–1			Grund 11'	
1 July 2015	18:00		Markelsheim	FC Ingolstadt 04 II	2–0	523	Shapourzadeh 10' (pen.); Weil 45'		
4 July 2015	15:00	A	Eiterfeld	Borussia Fulda	6–1		Goal	Goal	
4 July 2015	17:00	A	Eiterfeld	Eintracht Braunschweig II	1–0		Goal		
8 July 2015	18:30	A	Kleinrinderfeld	Wormatia Worms	0–0	500			
11 July 2015	18:00	A	Hanau	SG Wattenscheid 09	6–0		Shapourzadeh 28', 32', 37'; Gutjahr 47'; Russ 50'; Weiß 60'		
14 July 2015	19:00	A	Bad Kissingen	1. FC Nürnberg	2–2	3,400	Schoppenhauer 4'; Jabiri 82'	Schöpf 23'; Gíslason 49' (pen.)	
18 July 2015	15:30	A	Neunkirchen	FSV Frankfurt	3–1	400	Haller 47'; Weil 59'; Benatelli 63'	Dedić 49' (pen.)	
8 January 2016	15:30		La Manga	K.A.A. Gent	0–5			Coulibaly 34'; Olayinka 46'; Simon 61', 77'; Milicevic 73'	
11 January 2016	16:00		La Manga	VfR Aalen	2–1		Fennell 2'; Karsanidis 3'	Neumann 23'	
14 January 2016	15:00		La Manga	FC Cartagena	1–1		Nagy 25'	39'	
17 January 2016		A	Stuttgart	VfB Stuttgart	2–1		Karsanidis 36'; Shapourzadeh 89'	Kravets 2'	
24 March 2016	16:00	A	Fürth	SpVgg Greuther Fürth	2–1	300	Weil 66' (pen.); Jabiri 87'	Vukušić 30'	

== 3. Liga ==
=== 3. Liga fixtures & results ===
Win Draw Loss Postponed

MD	Date Kickoff^{1}	H/A	Opponent	Res. F–A	Att.	Goalscorers		Table		Ref.
MD	Date Kickoff^{1}	H/A	Opponent	Res. F–A	Att.	Würzburger Kickers	Opponent	Pos.	Pts.	Ref.
1	25 July 2015; 14:00	A	SV Wehen Wiesbaden	0–0	2,234			9th	1	
2	1 August 2015; 14:00	H	SG Dynamo Dresden	1–1	9,011	Shapourzadeh 78'	Hefele 84' (pen.)	14th	2	
3	15 August 2015; 14:00	A	SC Preußen Münster	0–0	7,125			14th	3	
4	22 August 2015; 14:00	H	SG Sonnenhof Großaspach	0–1	5,700		Binakaj 27'	15th	3	
5	25 August 2015; 19:00	A	VfB Stuttgart II	2–0	956	Russ 56'; Benatelli 79'		11th	6	
6	29 August 2015; 14:00	H	FC Erzgebirge Aue	1–0	5,359	Bieber 57'		7th	9	
7	5 September 2015; 14:00	H	FC Rot-Weiß Erfurt	0–0	6,337			9th	10	
8	12 September 2015; 14:00	A	1. FSV Mainz 05 II	0–1	1,015		Parker 57'	12th	10	
9	19 September 2015; 14:00	H	Hallescher FC	0–1	3,950		Müller 89'	13th	10	
10	22 September 2015; 19:00	A	SV Werder Bremen II	0–0	275			14th	11	
11	25 September 2015; 19:00	H	Chemnitzer FC	1–1	5,501	Nothnagel 9'	Danneberg 87'	15th	12	
12	3 October 2015; 14:00	A	SC Fortuna Köln	3–0	1,754	Daghfous 15'; Benatelli 43'; Jabiri 49'		11th	15	
13	17 October 2015; 14:00	H	VfL Osnabrück	0–1	4,388		Groß 15'	12th	15	
14	24 October 2015; 14:00	A	Stuttgarter Kickers	2–1	4,000	Shapourzadeh 38'; Weil 73'	Soriano 23'	11th	18	
15	31 October 2015; 14:00	H	VfR Aalen	2–2	4,395	Schoppenhauer 69'; Shapourzadeh 76'	Drexler 74'; Kienle 86'	11th	19	
16	7 November 2015; 14:00	A	Hansa Rostock	0–0	9,050			9th	20	
17	21 November 2015; 14:00	H	Energie Cottbus	2–2	4,178	Weil 48'; Jabiri 68'	Breitkreuz 19', 63'	10th	21	
18	28 November 2015; 14:00	A	Holstein Kiel	2–1	4,807	Daghfous 29'; Jabiri 74'	Kurzweg 19' (o.g.)	8th	24	
19	5 December 2015; 14:00	H	1. FC Magdeburg	1–1	5,617	Fennell 88'	Beck 42'	9th	25	
20	12 December 2015; 14:00	H	SV Wehen Wiesbaden	0–0	3,301			9th	26	
21	17 December 2015; 20:30	A	Dynamo Dresden	1–2	25,775	Karsanidis 38'	Testroet 28'; Eilers 45+1'	11th	26	
22	30 January 2016; 14:00	A	SG Sonnenhof Großaspach	2–1	2,500	Weil 48'; Soriano 48'	Dittgen 48'	10th	29	
23	6 February 2016; 14:00	H	VfB Stuttgart II	0–0	3,751			8th	30	
24	14 February 2016; 14:00	A	FC Erzgebirge Aue	0–0	6,000			10th	31	
25	17 February 2016; 19:00	H	Preußen Münster	3–0	3,896	Soriano 3', 10'; Fennell 90'		7th	34	
26	21 February 2016; 14:00	A	Rot-Weiß Erfurt	0–1	4,121		Kammlott 55'	10th	34	
27	27 February 2016; 14:00	H	1. FSV Mainz 05 II	1–0	3,503	Shapourzadeh 28' (pen.)		8th	37	
28	1 March 2016; 19:00	A	Hallescher FC	3–1	6,043	Karsanidis 36'; Daghfous 51'; Benatelli 64'	Kleineheismann 71'	6th	40	
29	5 March 2016; 14:00	H	SV Werder Bremen II	1–1	3,721	Shapourzadeh 80' (pen.)	von Haacke 90+3' (pen.)	6th	41	
30	12 March 2016; 14:00	A	Chemnitzer FC	1–0	5,586	Benatelli 28'		6th	44	
31	18 March 2016; 19:00	H	SC Fortuna Köln	4–1	5,378	Shapourzadeh 39' (pen.); Soriano 51'; Jabiri 76'; Daghfous 81'	Königs 35'	4th	47	
32	2 April 2016; 14:00	A	VfL Osnabrück	1–1	10,395	Fennell 44'	Alvarez 10'	5th	48	
33	9 April 2016; 14:00	H	Stuttgarter Kickers	2–1	5,422	Shapourzadeh 44' (pen.) 70'	Badiane 78'	4th	51	
34	15 April 2016; 19:00	A	VfR Aalen	1–0	5,096	Benatelli 4'		3rd	54	
35	23 April 2016; 14:00	H	Hansa Rostock	2–1	7,969	Soriano 22', 32'	Ahlschwede 78'	3rd	57	
36	30 April 2016; 14:00	A	Energie Cottbus	2–1	5,907	Soriano 61'; Fennell 66'	Sukuta-Pasu 12'	3rd	60	
37	7 May 2015; 13:30	H	Holstein Kiel	1–1	8,776	Haller 81'	Lewerenz 31'	3rd	61	
38	14 May 2015; 13:30	A	1. FC Magdeburg	1–0	22,072	Soriano 14'		3rd	64	

==== Promotion play-off results ====
On 7 May 2016, Würzburger Kickers qualified for the promotion play-off.

MD	Date Kickoff^{1}	H/A	Opponent	Res. F–A	Att.	Goalscorers		Ref.
MD	Date Kickoff^{1}	H/A	Opponent	Res. F–A	Att.	Würzburger Kickers	Opponent	Ref.
First leg	20 May 2016; 19:10	H	MSV Duisburg	2–0	9,806	Weil 10' (pen.); Nagy 79'		
Second leg	24 May 2016; 19:10	A	MSV Duisburg	2–1	29,500	Soriano 37'; Benatelli 90+2'	Schoppenhauer 33' (o.g.)	

=== League table ===
Pos	Team	Pld	W	D	L	GF	GA	GD	Pts	Promotion, qualification or relegation
1	Dynamo Dresden (C, P)	38	21	15	2	75	35	+40	78	Promotion to 2. Bundesliga and qualification for DFB-Pokal
2	Erzgebirge Aue (P)	38	19	13	6	42	21	+21	70	Promotion to 2. Bundesliga and qualification for DFB-Pokal
3	Würzburger Kickers (O, P)	38	16	16	6	43	25	+18	64	Qualification for promotion play-offs and DFB-Pokal
4	1. FC Magdeburg	38	14	14	10	49	37	+12	56	Qualification for DFB-Pokal
5	VfL Osnabrück	38	14	14	10	46	41	+5	56	

Source: DFB
Rules for classification: 1) Points; 2) Goal difference; 3) Goals scored
(C) Champions; (O) Play-off winners; (P) Promoted

== DFB-Pokal ==
Win Draw Loss Postponed

RD	Date	Kickoff^{1}	Venue	City	Opponent	Result^{2}	Attendance	Goalscorers		Ref.
RD	Date	Kickoff^{1}	Venue	City	Opponent	Result^{2}	Attendance	Würzburger Kickers	Opponent	Ref.
Round 1	8 August 2015	15:30	H	Würzburg	Werder Bremen	0–2 (a.e.t.)	9,706		Ujah 102'; Bartels 108'	

== Bavarian Cup ==
Win Draw Loss Postponed

RD	Date	Kickoff^{1}	Venue	City	Opponent	Result^{2}	Attendance	Goalscorers		Ref.
RD	Date	Kickoff^{1}	Venue	City	Opponent	Result^{2}	Attendance	Würzburger Kickers	Opponent	Ref.
1	12 August 2015	18:15	A	Münnerstadt	FC Teutonia Reichenbach	6–0	400	Jabiri 33', 34', 77'; Bieber 60' (pen.); Weiß 71'; Weißenberger 74'		
2	19 August 2015	18:15	A	Großbardorf	TSV Großbardorf	4–0	1,350	Bieber 35', 64'; Jabiri 42', 82'		
3	6 October 2015	19:00	A	Bamberg	FC Eintracht Bamberg	3–2	650	Shapourzadeh 30', 75'; Vocaj 44'	Haas 14'; Seybold 90'	
QF	6 April 2016	18:00	A	Schalding-Heining	SV Schalding-Heining	3–1	544	Gutjahr 30', 75'; Nagy 44'	Pillmeier 8'	
SF	20 April 2016	18:30	A	Memmingen	FC Memmingen	3–0	861	Gutjahr 5'; Russ 39'; Jabiri 69'		
Final	28 May 2016	14:30	A	Unterhaching	SpVgg Unterhaching	6–2	3,200	Shapourzadeh 57', 59', 61', 64'; Nagy 65', 81'	Sieghart 4'; Russ 72'	

== Player informations ==
As of 30 May 2016.

No.	Pos	Nat	Player	Total		3. Liga		DFB–Pokal		Bavarian Cup	
No.	Pos	Nat	Player	Apps	Goals	Apps	Goals	Apps	Goals	Apps	Goals
1	GK	(Germany) GER	Dominik Brunnhübner	8	0	2	0	1	0	5	0
2	MF	(Germany) GER	Dennis Schmitt	1	0	0	0	0	0	1	0
3	DF	(Germany) GER	Dominik Nothnagel	36	1	30	1	1	0	5	0
4	MF	(Germany) GER	Rico Benatelli	41	6	38	6	0	0	3	0
5	DF	(Germany) GER	Clemens Schoppenhauer	38	1	32	1	1	0	5	0
6	DF	(Germany) GER	Niklas Weißenberger	14	1	10	0	0	0	4	1
7	MF	(Germany) GER	Marco Haller	26	1	22	1	1	0	3	0
8	MF	(Albania) ALB	Liridon Vocaj	18	1	14	0	0	0	4	1
9	MF	(Iran) IRI	Amir Shapourzadeh	35	14	32	8	1	0	2	6
10	MF	(Germany) GER	Nejmeddin Daghfous	32	4	31	4	0	0	1	0
11	MF	(Germany) GER	Richard Weil	42	4	38	4	1	0	3	0
14	MF	(Greece) GRE	Joannis Karsanidis	39	2	35	2	1	0	3	0
16	DF	(Germany) GER	Peter Kurzweg	37	0	32	0	1	0	4	0
17	FW	(Germany) GER	Daniele Bruno	0	0	0	0	0	0	0	0
18	MF	(Germany) GER	Nico Gutjahr	10	3	5	0	1	0	4	3
19	GK	(Germany) GER	Kenan Mujezinovic	1	0	0	0	0	0	1	0
20	MF	(Hungary) HUN	Dániel Nagy	30	4	25	1	1	0	4	3
21	DF	(Germany) GER	Christian Demirtas	7	0	5	0	0	0	2	0
22	DF	(Germany) GER	Dennis Russ	26	2	19	1	1	0	6	1
25	DF	(Germany) GER	Paweł Thomik	12	0	10	0	1	0	1	0
26	DF	(United States) USA	Royal-Dominique Fennell	42	4	39	4	1	0	2	0
27	FW	(Germany) GER	Adam Jabiri	32	10	26	4	1	0	5	6
28	GK	(Poland) POL	Robert Wulnikowski	39	0	39	0	0	0	0	0
30	MF	(Germany) GER	Emanuel Taffertshofer	18	0	16	0	0	0	2	0
31	DF	(Germany) GER	Nico Herzig	5	0	4	0	0	0	1	0
32	DF	(Germany) GER	Lukas Billick	23	0	19	0	0	0	4	0
33	FW	(Italy) ITA	Elia Soriano	17	9	15	9	0	0	2	0
37	FW	(Germany) GER	Christopher Bieber	19	4	16	1	0	0	3	3
Players who left the club during the 2015–16 season
23	MF	(Germany) GER	Fabian Weiß	2	1	1	0	0	0	1	1

== Notes ==
- 1.Kickoff time in Central European Time/Central European Summer Time.
- 2.Würzburger Kickers goals first.
