= 2016–17 Würzburger Kickers season =

Würzburger Kickers
2016–17 season
- Chairman: Dr. Michael Schlagbauer
- Manager: Bernd Hollerbach
- Stadium: flyeralarm Arena
- 2. Bundesliga: 17th (relegated)
- DFB-Pokal: Second round

The 2016–17 Würzburger Kickers season was their 2nd season in the 2. Bundesliga. They won promotion after beating MSV Duisburg in the 2015–16 2. Bundesliga Relegation play-offs.

== Transfers ==
=== In ===
| Pos. | Name | Age | Moving from | Type | Transfer Window | Contract ends | Transfer fee | Ref. |
|---|---|---|---|---|---|---|---|---|
| DF | (Germany) Felix Müller | 23 | SC Preußen Münster | Transfer | Summer | 2018 | | |
| DF | (Costa Rica) Júnior Díaz | 32 | SV Darmstadt 98 | Transfer | Summer | | | |
| DF | (Croatia) Franko Uzelac | 21 | VfB Oldenburg | Transfer | Summer | 2018 | | |
| DF | (Germany) Sascha Traut | 31 | Karlsruher SC | Transfer | Summer | 2018 | Free | |
| FW | (Germany) Marco Königs | 26 | SC Fortuna Köln | Transfer | Summer | 2018 | | |
| MF | (Germany) Tobias Schröck | 23 | SG Sonnenhof Großaspach | Transfer | Summer | 2018 | | |
| MF | (Germany) Patrick Weihrauch | 22 | FC Bayern München | Transfer | Summer | 2018 | Free | |
| MF | (Albania) Valdet Rama | 28 | TSV 1860 Munich | Transfer | Summer | 2018 | | |
| DF | (Germany) Sebastian Neumann | 25 | VfR Aalen | Transfer | Summer | 2018 | | |
| DF | (Germany) Leon Volz | 19 | SB/DJK Rosenheim | Transfer | Summer | | | |

=== Out ===
| Pos. | Name | Age | Moving to | Type | Transfer Window | Transfer fee | Ref. |
|---|---|---|---|---|---|---|---|
| FW | (Germany) Christopher Bieber | 26 | Rot-Weiß Erfurt | Transfer | Summer | | |
| MF | (Albania) Liridon Vocaj | 22 | Rot-Weiß Erfurt | Transfer | Summer | | |
| DF | (Germany) Paweł Thomik | 31 | | Released | Summer | | |
| DF | (Germany) Nico Herzig | 32 | | Released | Summer | | |
| DF | (Germany) Lukas Billick | 28 | | Released | Summer | | |
| FW | (Germany) Adam Jabiri | 32 | 1. FC Schweinfurt 05 | Released | Summer | | |
| DF | (Germany) Niklas Weißenberger | 23 | | Released | Summer | | |
| MF | (Germany) Nico Gutjahr | 23 | | Released | Summer | | |
| FW | (Germany) Daniele Bruno | 20 | | Released | Summer | | |
| DF | (Germany) Christian Demirtas | 32 | | Retirement | Summer | | |
| MF | (Germany) Marco Haller | 32 | 1. FC Schweinfurt 05 | Transfer | Summer | | |

== 2. Bundesliga ==
=== League table ===
| Pos | Team | Pld | W | D | L | GF | GA | GD | Pts | Promotion, qualification or relegation |
|---|---|---|---|---|---|---|---|---|---|---|
| 14 | Erzgebirge Aue | 34 | 10 | 9 | 15 | 37 | 52 | −15 | 39 | |
| 15 | Arminia Bielefeld | 34 | 8 | 13 | 13 | 50 | 54 | −4 | 37 | |
| 16 | 1860 Munich (Note: 1860 Munich, who lost in the relegation play-offs, were unable to obtain a license for the 2017–18 3. Liga. Therefore, 1860 Munich was relegated to the Regionalliga Bayern.) (R) | 34 | 10 | 6 | 18 | 37 | 47 | −10 | 36 | Qualification for relegation play-offs |
| 17 | Würzburger Kickers (R) | 34 | 7 | 13 | 14 | 32 | 41 | −9 | 34 | Relegation to 3. Liga |
| 18 | Karlsruher SC (R) | 34 | 5 | 10 | 19 | 27 | 56 | −29 | 25 | Relegation to 3. Liga |

Source: DFB
Rules for classification: 1) Points; 2) Goal difference; 3) Goals scored
(R) Relegated

=== Matches ===
2. Bundesliga match details
| Match | Date | Time | Opponent | Venue | Result F–A | Scorers | Attendance | Ref. |
|---|---|---|---|---|---|---|---|---|
| 1 | 7 August 2016 | 15:30 | Eintracht Braunschweig | Away | 1–2 | Soriano 61' | 20,390 | |
| 2 | 14 August 2016 | 15:30 | 1. FC Kaiserslautern | Home | 1–1 | Weil 45' pen. | 12,087 | |
| 3 | 26 August 2016 | 18:30 | 1. FC Heidenheim | Away | 2–1 | Weihrauch 17', Benatelli 89' | 11,100 | |
| 4 | 9 September 2016 | 18:30 | VfL Bochum | Home | 2–0 | Soriano 62', Benatelli 90+2' | 10,473 | |
| 5 | 16 September 2016 | 18:30 | Greuther Fürth | Away | 3–0 | Pisot 10', 79', Schröck 84' | 10,510 | |
| 6 | 21 September 2016 | 17:30 | Union Berlin | Home | 0–1 | | 10,148 | |
| 7 | 25 September 2016 | 13:30 | Dynamo Dresden | Away | 2–2 | Müller 50', Schröck 72' | 27,710 | |
| 8 | 2 October 2016 | 13:30 | 1860 Munich | Home | 2–0 | Soriano 27' pen., Müller 82' | 12,475 | |
| 9 | 14 October 2016 | 18:30 | Arminia Bielefeld | Away | 1–0 | Daghfous 82' | 14,102 | |
| 10 | 21 October 2016 | 18:30 | Karlsruher SC | Home | 0–2 | | 11,054 | |
| 11 | 30 October 2016 | 13:30 | Hannover 96 | Away | 1–3 | Soriano 24' | 31,200 | |
| 12 | 7 November 2016 | 20:15 | FC St. Pauli | Home | 1–0 | Hedenstad 84' o.g. | 13,080 | |
| 13 | 18 November 2016 | 18:30 | 1. FC Nürnberg | Away | 2–2 | Soriano 54', Pisot 56' pen. | 37,673 | |
| 14 | 25 November 2016 | 18:30 | Erzgebirge Aue | Home | 1–1 | Sušac 23' o.g. | 9,138 | |
| 15 | 4 December 2016 | 13:30 | Fortuna Düsseldorf | Home | 0–0 | | 10,207 | |
| 16 | 11 December 2016 | 13:30 | SV Sandhausen | Away | 0–0 | | 4,737 | |
| 17 | 18 December 2016 | 13:30 | VfB Stuttgart | Home | 3–0 | Benatelli 27', Schoppenhauer 40', Daghfous 80' | 12,475 | |
| 18 | 28 January 2017 | 13:00 | Eintracht Braunschweig | Home | 1–1 | Rama 33' | 10,152 | |
| 19 | 3 February 2017 | 18:30 | 1. FC Kaiserslautern | Away | 0–1 | | 19,943 | |
| 20 | 11 February 2017 | 13:00 | 1. FC Heidenheim | Home | 0–2 | | 8,569 | |
| 21 | 18 February 2017 | 13:00 | VfL Bochum | Away | 1–2 | Hoogland 26' o.g. | 11,123 | |
| 22 | 24 February 2017 | 18:30 | Greuther Fürth | Home | 1–1 | Schröck 47' | 10,251 | |
| 23 | 3 March 2017 | 18:30 | Union Berlin | Away | 0–2 | | 19,875 | |
| 24 | 11 March 2017 | 13:00 | Dynamo Dresden | Home | 0–2 | | 12,450 | |
| 25 | 17 March 2017 | 18:30 | 1860 Munich | Away | 1–2 | Kurzweg 90+2' | 22,600 | |
| 26 | 1 April 2017 | 13:00 | Arminia Bielefeld | Home | 1–1 | Benatelli 17' | 10,428 | |
| 27 | 4 April 2017 | 17:30 | Karlsruher SC | Away | 1–1 | Benatelli 51' | 12,710 | |
| 28 | 7 April 2017 | 18:30 | Hannover 96 | Home | 0–0 | | 12,450 | |
| 29 | 16 April 2017 | 13:30 | FC St. Pauli | Away | 0–1 | | 29,546 | |
| 30 | 23 April 2017 | 13:30 | 1. FC Nürnberg | Home | 1–1 | Rama 10' | 12,450 | |
| 31 | 30 April 2017 | 13:30 | Erzgebirge Aue | Away | 1–3 | Weihrauch 60' | 9,600 | |
| 32 | 6 May 2017 | 13:00 | Fortuna Düsseldorf | Away | 1–1 | Fröde 85' | 27,192 | |
| 33 | 14 May 2017 | 15:30 | SV Sandhausen | Home | 0–1 | | 11,571 | |
| 34 | 21 May 2017 | 15:30 | VfB Stuttgart | Away | 1–4 | Schröck 78' | 60,000 | |

== DFB-Pokal ==
DFB-Pokal match details
| Round | Date | Time | Opponent | Venue | Result F–A | Scorers | Attendance | Ref. |
|---|---|---|---|---|---|---|---|---|
| First round | 20 August 2016 | 15:30 | Eintracht Braunschweig | Home | 1–0 (a.e.t.) | Soriano 103' | 6,384 | |
| Second round | 25 October 2016 | 18:30 | 1860 Munich | Home | 0–0 (a.e.t.) (3–4 p) | | 12,142 | |

== Player informations ==
As of 11 June 2016.

| No. | Pos | Nat | Player | Total | | 2. Bundesliga | | DFB–Pokal | |
| No. | Pos | Nat | Player | Apps | Goals | Apps | Goals | Apps | Goals |
|---|---|---|---|---|---|---|---|---|---|
| 1 | GK | (Germany) GER | Dominik Brunnhübner | 0 | 0 | 0 | 0 | 0 | 0 |
| 2 | MF | (Germany) GER | Dennis Schmitt | 0 | 0 | 0 | 0 | 0 | 0 |
| 3 | DF | (Germany) GER | Dominik Nothnagel | 0 | 0 | 0 | 0 | 0 | 0 |
| 4 | MF | (Germany) GER | Rico Benatelli | 0 | 0 | 0 | 0 | 0 | 0 |
| 5 | DF | (Germany) GER | Clemens Schoppenhauer | 0 | 0 | 0 | 0 | 0 | 0 |
| 9 | MF | (Iran) IRN | Amir Shapourzadeh | 0 | 0 | 0 | 0 | 0 | 0 |
| 10 | MF | (Germany) GER | Nejmeddin Daghfous | 0 | 0 | 0 | 0 | 0 | 0 |
| 11 | MF | (Germany) GER | Richard Weil | 0 | 0 | 0 | 0 | 0 | 0 |
| 14 | MF | (Greece) GRE | Joannis Karsanidis | 0 | 0 | 0 | 0 | 0 | 0 |
| 16 | DF | (Germany) GER | Peter Kurzweg | 0 | 0 | 0 | 0 | 0 | 0 |
| 19 | GK | (Germany) GER | Kenan Mujezinovic | 0 | 0 | 0 | 0 | 0 | 0 |
| 20 | MF | (Hungary) HUN | Dániel Nagy | 0 | 0 | 0 | 0 | 0 | 0 |
| 22 | DF | (Germany) GER | Dennis Russ | 0 | 0 | 0 | 0 | 0 | 0 |
| 26 | DF | (United States) USA | Royal-Dominique Fennell | 0 | 0 | 0 | 0 | 0 | 0 |
| 28 | GK | (Poland) POL | Robert Wulnikowski | 0 | 0 | 0 | 0 | 0 | 0 |
| 30 | MF | (Germany) GER | Emanuel Taffertshofer | 0 | 0 | 0 | 0 | 0 | 0 |
| 33 | FW | (Italy) ITA | Elia Soriano | 0 | 0 | 0 | 0 | 0 | 0 |
| | DF | (Germany) GER | Leon Volz | 0 | 0 | 0 | 0 | 0 | 0 |
| | DF | (Croatia) CRO | Franko Uzelac | 0 | 0 | 0 | 0 | 0 | 0 |
| | DF | (Germany) GER | Sebastian Neumann | 0 | 0 | 0 | 0 | 0 | 0 |
| | DF | (Germany) GER | Sascha Traut | 0 | 0 | 0 | 0 | 0 | 0 |
| | DF | (Germany) GER | Felix Müller | 0 | 0 | 0 | 0 | 0 | 0 |
| | FW | (Germany) GER | Marco Königs | 0 | 0 | 0 | 0 | 0 | 0 |
| | MF | (Germany) GER | Tobias Schröck | 0 | 0 | 0 | 0 | 0 | 0 |
| | MF | (Germany) GER | Patrick Weihrauch | 0 | 0 | 0 | 0 | 0 | 0 |
