= Joannis Karsanidis =

German footballer

Ioannis Karsanidis
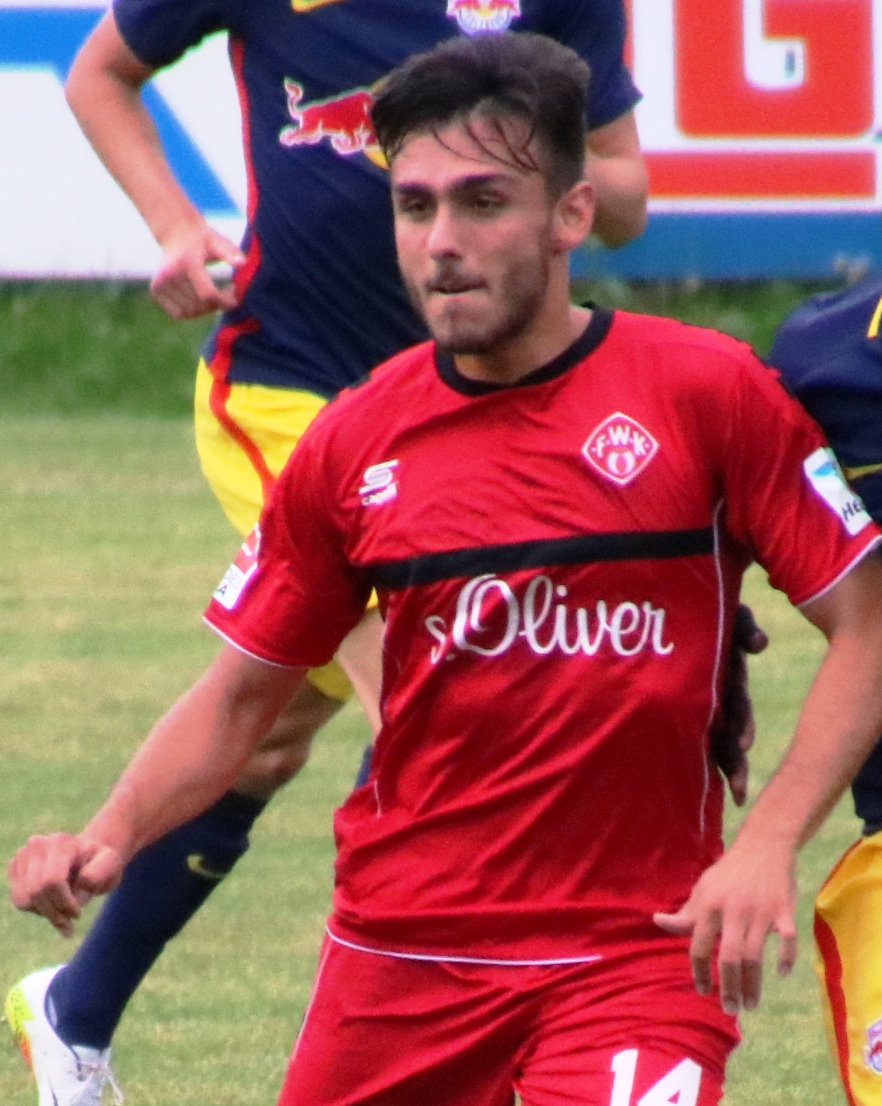

Personal information
- Date of birth: 25 June 1993 (age 33)
- Place of birth: Nuremberg, Germany
- Height: 1.77 m (5 ft 9 1/2 in)
- Position: Midfielder

Senior career*
Years	Team	Apps	(Gls)
2013–2018	Würzburger Kickers	63	(3)
2018–2021	Chemnitzer FC	29	(1)
- * Club domestic league appearances and goals

Joannis Karsanidis (born 25 June 1993), also spelt Ioannis, is German former footballer of Greek descent who played as a midfielder.

== Club career ==
On 30 May 2016, Karsanidis extended his contract with Würzburger Kickers until 2018.

== International career ==
Karsanidis was born in Germany and is of Greek and Russian descent, he says he would prefer to play for Greece national football team.

== Honours ==
Würzburger Kickers

Winner

- Bavarian Cup (2): 2013–14, 2015–16
