= Marco Haller =

Marco Haller can refer to:

- Marco Haller (footballer) (born 1984), German
- Marco Haller (cyclist) (born 1991), Austrian
