= Rico Benatelli =

German footballer

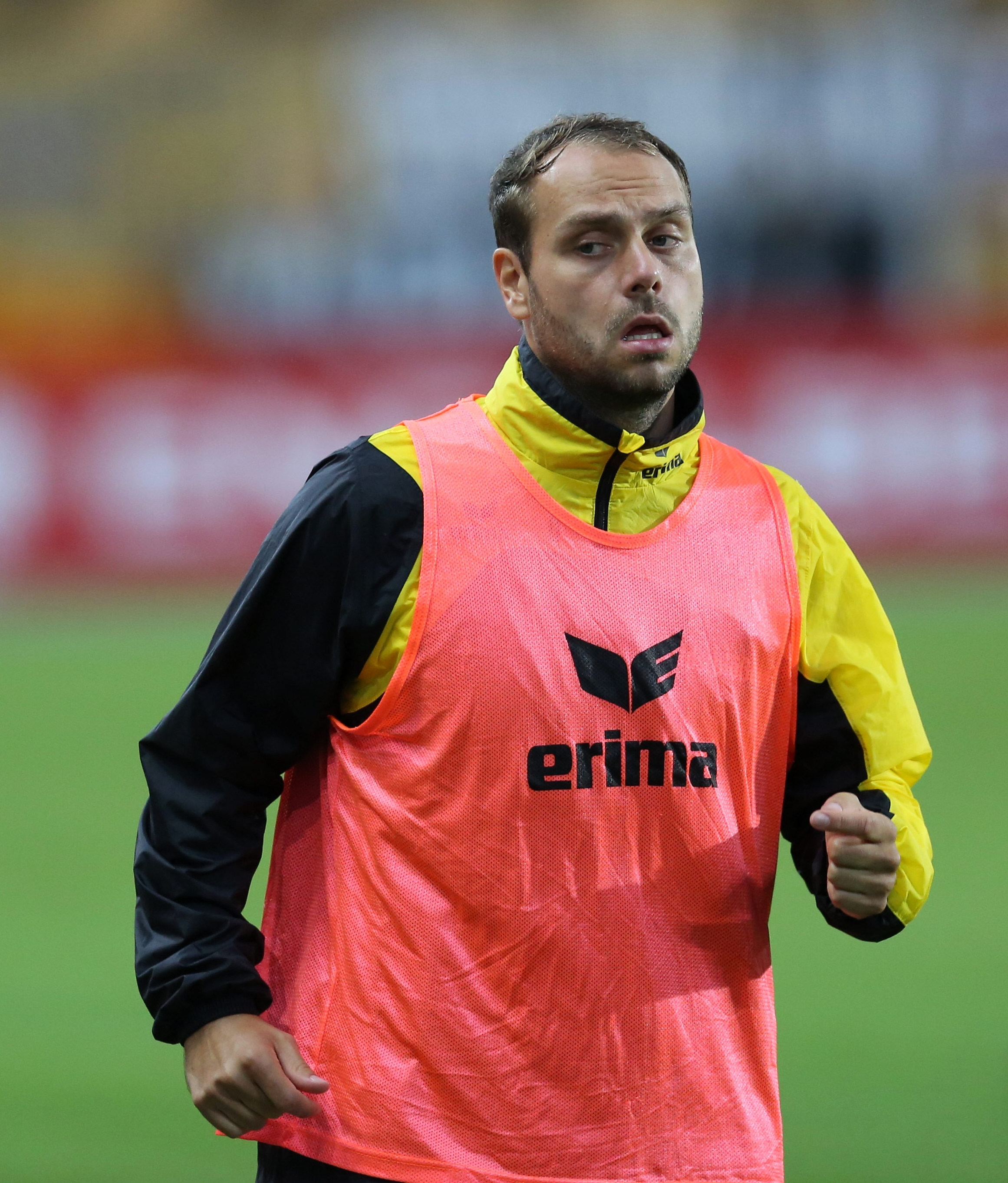
- Benatelli with Dynamo Dresden in 2017

Personal information
- Date of birth: 17 March 1992 (age 34)
- Place of birth: Herdecke, Germany
- Height: 1.81 m (5 ft 11 in)
- Position: Attacking midfielder

Team information
- Current team: SV Elversberg II
- Number: 6

Youth career
- 1999–2008: VfL Bochum
- 2008–2011: Borussia Dortmund

Senior career*
Years	Team	Apps	(Gls)
2011–2013	Borussia Dortmund II	63	(13)
2013–2015	Erzgebirge Aue	52	(6)
2015–2017	Würzburger Kickers	65	(10)
2017–2019	Dynamo Dresden	45	(3)
2019–2022	FC St. Pauli	63	(3)
2019–2020	→ FC St. Pauli II	4	(0)
2022–2024	Austria Klagenfurt	55	(1)
2024–2026	Waldhof Mannheim	27	(1)
2026–	SV Elversberg II	0	(0)
- * Club domestic league appearances and goals as of 16 May 2026

Rico Benatelli (born 17 March 1992) is a German professional footballer who plays as an attacking midfielder for Oberliga Rheinland-Pfalz/Saar side SV Elversberg II.

== Career ==
Born in Herdecke and raised in Bochum, Benatelli went through the youth ranks of local heavyweights VfL Bochum. Still during his youth career he moved to Borussia Dortmund where he stayed for five years, playing two years senior football for the club's reserve team in the fourth and third tier.

In July 2015, after Erzgebirge Aue had been relegated from 2. Bundesliga, he joined newly promoted fellow 3. Liga side Würzburger Kickers on a free transfer, signing a two-year-contract until 2017.

On 28 July 2022, Benatelli signed a two-year contract with Austria Klagenfurt in Austria.

On 19 June 2024, Bentalli moved to Waldhof Mannheim in 3. Liga.

== Personal life ==
He is the son of former professional footballer Frank Benatelli. Rico is of Italian descent.

== Career statistics ==
As of match played on 4 July 2019

Appearances and goals by club, season and competition
Club	Season	League			Cup		Other		Total	
Club	Season	Division	Apps	Goals	Apps	Goals	Apps	Goals	Apps	Goals
Borussia Dortmund II	2011–12	Regionalliga	27	6	—				27	6
Borussia Dortmund II	2012–13	3. Liga	36	7	—				36	7
Borussia Dortmund II	Total		63	13	0	0	0	0	63	13
Erzgebirge Aue	2013–14	2. Bundesliga	23	3	0	0	0	0	23	3
Erzgebirge Aue	2014–15	2. Bundesliga	29	3	1	0	0	0	30	3
Erzgebirge Aue	Total		52	6	1	0	0	0	53	6
Würzburger Kickers	2015–16	3. Liga	36	5	0	0	2 (Note: Appearances in Promotion/relegation play-offs)	1	38	6
Würzburger Kickers	2016–17	2. Bundesliga	29	5	2	0	0	0	31	5
Würzburger Kickers	Total		65	10	2	0	2	1	69	11
Dynamo Dresden	2017–18	2. Bundesliga	21	2	2	1	0	0	23	3
Dynamo Dresden	2018–19	2. Bundesliga	24	1	1	0	0	0	25	1
Dynamo Dresden	Total		45	3	3	1	0	0	48	4
Career total			225	32	6	1	2	1	233	34
