= Fabian Weiss =

Fabian Weiss may refer to:

- Fabian Weiß, German midfield footballer
- Fabian Weiss (cyclist), Swiss cyclist
