= Niklas Weißenberger =

German footballer

Personal information
- Date of birth: 13 May 1993 (age 33)
- Place of birth: Würzburg, Germany
- Height: 1.85 m (6 ft 1 in)
- Position: Defender

Team information
- Current team: Sportfreunde Dorfmerkingen

Senior career*
Years	Team	Apps	(Gls)
2012–2013	Greuther Fürth II	25	(2)
2013–2016	Würzburger Kickers	71	(2)
2016–	Sportfreunde Dorfmerkingen	30	(20)
- * Club domestic league appearances and goals as of 30 July 2017

Niklas Weißenberger (born 13 May 1993) is a German footballer who plays as a defender for Sportfreunde Dorfmerkingen. He played for Würzburger Kickers.

== Honours ==
Würzburger Kickers

- Bavarian Cup: 2013–14
