= 2013–14 Bavarian Cup =

Tournament details
- Country: Germany
- Teams: 64

Final positions
- Champions: Würzburger Kickers
- Runners-up: SV Schalding-Heining
- DFB-Pokal: 2014–15 DFB-Pokal

Tournament statistics
- Matches played: 63
- Top goal scorer: Christoph Hegenbart (SpVgg SV Weiden) (8 goals)

The 2013–14 Bavarian Cup (German: Bayerischer Toto-Pokal 2013–14) was the seventeenth edition of this competition, first held in 1998 and organised by the Bavarian Football Association (BFV). The winner, Würzburger Kickers of the Regionalliga Bayern, was qualified for the first round of the 2014–15 DFB-Pokal, the German Cup. Würzburg went on to defeat 2. Bundesliga club Fortuna Düsseldorf in the first round and advance to the second.

The competition was open to all senior men's football teams playing within the Bavarian football league system and the 3. Liga.

== History ==
The Bavarian Cup, officially referred to as the Bayerischer Toto-Pokal for sponsorship reasons, was established in 1998. Until 2009 it was contested by only eight clubs, qualified through the seven annual regional cup competitions. Since 2009 the Bavarian Cup has been expanded to include 64 teams in the first round.

The defending champions of the competition were TSV 1860 Rosenheim who defeated SV Wacker Burghausen in the 2012–13 final.

== Rules and regulations ==
The competition is open to all member clubs of the Bavarian Football Association except the clubs playing in the Bundesliga and 2. Bundesliga. Reserve teams are also barred from the competition. The Bavarian clubs from the 3. Liga and Regionalliga Bayern and the 24 District Cup (Kreispokale) winners qualified directly for the first round of the competition. The 96 clubs from the two divisions of the Bayernliga and the five divisions of the Landesliga Bayern entered the qualifying stage of the competition. Clubs below the Landesliga had to take part in the Kreispokale to qualify.

For the 2013–14 edition this meant the three Bavarian 3. Liga clubs, the thirteen Regionalliga Bayern clubs that were not reserve sides, the 24 Kreispokal winners and 24 clubs qualified through the two rounds of qualifying entered the first round of the Bavarian Cup.

For the first two rounds of the Cup the draw was subdivided into five regional areas, for the third round in four regional areas. From the quarter-finals onwards no regional subdivision was applied anymore. Clubs from lower divisions were always awarded home advantage in the draw. Should both clubs in a match be of the same division the team drawn first received home advantage. Should both clubs in a match be of the same division the team drawn first received home advantage. If a game was drawn after regular time no extra time was played. Instead a penalty shoot out followed to determine the winner.

The winner of the 2013–14 Bavarian Cup was automatically qualified for the first round of the German Cup the following season. The second spot awarded to the Bavarian Football Association for the first round of the German Cup went to FV Illertissen, the best-placed non-reserve side in the Regionalliga Bayern. Should the same team have won the cup and finished as the best non-reserve side in the Regionalliga the second spot would have gone to the losing finalist.

== Schedule ==
The dates set for the various rounds were:

- First round: 21 August 2013
- Second round: 28 August 2013
- Round of sixteen: 3 October 2013
- Quarter finals: 9 April 2014
- Semi finals: 30 April 2014
- Final: 14 May 2014

== Prize money ==
The BFV awarded prize money to all clubs participating in the 2013–14 edition. Every Kreispokal winner was awarded €700. Every club participating in the first round received €150, the winners of the first round €250. From there it gradually increased to the winner of the competition receiving €5,000.

The winner of the Bavarian Cup also received another €140,000 from the DFB for participating in the first round of the DFB-Pokal. Apart from this the club also received the gate receipts as all amateur clubs are guaranteed a home game for the first round. By reaching the second round of the German Cup Würzburger Kickers earned €408,000 from the German Football Federation, the DFB in television and advertising revenue.

== Overview ==
The final of the competition saw two Regionalliga Bayern sides playing each other with SV Schalding-Heining hosting Würzburger Kickers. Schalding went ahead twice but eventually the game ended two all. In the following penalty shoot out Kickers defeated Schalding 4–2. It was the first cup win for Würzburg while SV Schalding-Heining had previously won the inaugural Bavarian Cup in 1998.

Of the three 3. Liga sides in the competition, the only clubs in the competition at fully professional level, Wacker Burghausen was knocked out in the semi-finals after the club had in turn knocked out SpVgg Unterhaching in the round before. The third of those clubs, Jahn Regensburg, was defeated 4–3 by Sportfreunde Dinkelsbühl in round two, a club playing three divisions lower in the Landesliga. Dinkelsbühl was also the only side from the Landesliga level or below to reach the last eight of the competition, eventually going out to Würzburger Kickers in the semi-finals.

== 2013–14 season ==
The games of the 2013–14 season:

=== First round ===
The first round, played between 20 and 22 August 2013:

| Home team | Away team | Score |
|---|---|---|
| TSV Großheubach (8)(K) | 1. FC Schweinfurt 05 (4) | 0–8 |
| FVgg Bayern Kitzingen (6) | FC Eintracht Bamberg (4) | 1–4 |
| TSV Kleinrinderfeld (6) | TSV Großbardorf (5) | 2–1 |
| FC Geesdorf (8)(K) | Würzburger Kickers (4) | 1–7 |
| SC Schollbrunn (7)(K) | SV Alemannia Haibach (5) | 0–2 |
| TSV Reiterswiesen (9)(K) | Viktoria Aschaffenburg (4) | 0–4 |
| SC Ichenhausen (7)(K) | FV Illertissen (4) | 1–4 |
| TSV Haunstetten (7)(K) | FC Memmingen (4) | 1–3 |
| VfB Durach (6) | SV Pullach (5) | 4–3 |
| FC Pipinsried (5) | TSV Schwabmünchen (5) | 5–1 |
| SVO Germaringen (7)(K) | SpVgg Unterhaching (3) | 0–5 |
| FC Garmisch-Partenkirchen (7)(K) | TSV 1860 Rosenheim (4) | 1–3 |
| SC Kirchroth (8)(K) | SV Wacker Burghausen (3) | 0–8 |
| SV Aicha (8)(K) | SV Schalding-Heining (4) | 1–8 |
| TSV Dorfen (8)(K) | TSV Buchbach (4) | 1–0 |
| SV Neubäu (8)(K) | SpVgg GW Deggendorf (6) | 2–1 |
| TSV Kastl (8)(K) | SpVgg Landshut (5) | 8–7 (pen) |
| FC Ismaning (5) | SV Waldeck (9)(K) | 5–0^{‡} |
| SB/DJK Rosenheim (5) | SV Heimstetten (4) | 2–4 |
| SC 1919 Zwiesel (7)(K) | 1. FC Bad Kötzting (6) | 6–5 (pen) |
| FC/DJK Weißenburg (8)(K) | SV Seligenporten (4) | 2–1 |
| SV Sportfreunde Dinkelsbühl (6)(K) | SpVgg Ansbach (6) | 5–3 (pen) |
| TSV Nördlingen (6) | BC Aichach (5) | 1–0 |
| FC Laimerstadt (9)(K) | SSV Jahn Regensburg (3) | 0–11 |
| FC Viehhausen (8)(K) | TSV Rain am Lech (4) | 0–4 |
| ASV Neumarkt (5) | DJK Ammerthal (5) | 0–1 |
| 1. FC Hersbruck (8)(K) | SpVgg Bayern Hof (4) | 1:8 |
| TSV Mönchröden (7)(K) | VfL Frohnlach (4) | 0–3 |
| FC Steinbach-Dürrenwaid (7)(K) | SpVgg Selbitz (5) | 2–8 |
| FC Dießfurt (8)(K) | SpVgg SV Weiden (5) | 0–7 |
| TSV Neudrossenfeld (6) | SpVgg Jahn Forchheim (5) | 2–4 |
| Sportring Bayreuth (9)(K) | ASV Pegnitz (6) | 1–12 |

- ^{‡} SV Waldeck exchanged home advantage with FC Ismaning.

=== Second round ===
The second round, played between 25 August and 11 September 2013:

| Home team | Away team | Score |
|---|---|---|
| SpVgg SV Weiden (5) | SpVgg Selbitz (5) | 1–3 |
| VfL Frohnlach (4) | SpVgg Bayern Hof (4) | 1–2 |
| ASV Pegnitz (6) | SpVgg Jahn Forchheim (5) | 1–3 |
| TSV Nördlingen (6) | DJK Ammerthal (5) | 1–0 |
| SV Sportfreunde Dinkelsbühl (6)(K) | SSV Jahn Regensburg (3) | 4–3 |
| FC/DJK Weißenburg (8)(K) | TSV Rain am Lech (4) | 0–2 |
| TSV Kastl (8)(K) | SV Wacker Burghausen (3) | 0–4 |
| TSV Dorfen (8)(K) | SV Heimstetten (4) | 1–3 |
| SV Neubäu (8)(K) | FC Ismaning (5) | 1–2 |
| SC 1919 Zwiesel (7)(K) | SV Schalding-Heining (4) | 0–4 |
| FC Pipinsried (5) | FV Illertissen (4) | 3–2 |
| FC Memmingen (4) | SpVgg Unterhaching (3) | 1–3 |
| VfB Durach (6) | TSV 1860 Rosenheim (4) | 4–6 (pen) |
| SV Alemannia Haibach (5) | FC Eintracht Bamberg (4) | 6–4 |
| Würzburger Kickers (4) | Viktoria Aschaffenburg (4) | 5–3 |
| TSV Kleinrinderfeld (6) | 1. FC Schweinfurt 05 (4) | 0–2 |

=== Round of sixteen ===
The round of sixteen, played between 1 and 3 October 2013:

| Home team | Away team | Score |
|---|---|---|
| SV Heimstetten (4) | SV Wacker Burghausen (3) | 2–3 |
| FC Ismaning (5) | SV Schalding-Heining (4) | 3–4 (pen) |
| TSV Rain am Lech (4) | TSV 1860 Rosenheim (4) | 3–2 |
| SV Alemannia Haibach (5) | Würzburger Kickers (4) | 1–5 |
| SpVgg Selbitz (5) | 1. FC Schweinfurt 05 (4) | 4–2 (pen) |
| SV Sportfreunde Dinkelsbühl (6)(K) | TSV Nördlingen (6) | 3–0 |
| SpVgg Jahn Forchheim (5) | SpVgg Bayern Hof (4) | 4–5 (pen) |
| FC Pipinsried (5) | SpVgg Unterhaching (3) | 0–4 |

=== Quarter finals ===
The quarter finals, played between 8 and 9 April 2014:

| Home team | Away team | Score |
|---|---|---|
| Würzburger Kickers (4) | TSV Rain am Lech (4) | 2–0 |
| SpVgg Bayern Hof (4) | SV Schalding-Heining (4) | 1–3 |
| SV Sportfreunde Dinkelsbühl (6)(K) | SpVgg Selbitz (5) | 3–1 |
| SpVgg Unterhaching (3) | SV Wacker Burghausen (3) | 0–1 |

=== Semi finals ===
The semi finals, played on 30 April 2014:

| Home team | Away team | Score |
|---|---|---|
| SV Schalding-Heining (4) | SV Wacker Burghausen (3) | 1–0 |
| SV Sportfreunde Dinkelsbühl (6)(K) | Würzburger Kickers (4) | 1–2 |

=== Final ===
The final, played on 14 May 2014:

| Home team | Away team | Score |
|---|---|---|
| SV Schalding-Heining (4) | Würzburger Kickers (4) | 4–6 (pen) |

=== Key ===
| Symbol | League |
|---|---|
| (3) | 3. Liga |
| (4) | Regionalliga Bayern |
| (5) | Bayernliga |
| (6) | Landesliga |
| (7) | Bezirksliga |
| (8) | Kreisliga |
| (9) | Kreisklasse |
| (K) | District Cup winner |

== 2014–15 DFB-Pokal ==
The 2013–14 winner Würzburger Kickers qualified through the Bavarian Cup for the 2014–15 DFB-Pokal and drew the following opposition:

=== First round ===
17 August 2014
16:00

| Würzburger Kickers | 3–2 | Fortuna Düsseldorf |
|---|---|---|
| Bieber 51', 55'; Lewerenz 114' | Report | Schmidtgal 42'; Pinto 58' |

Flyeralarm Arena, Würzburg
Attendance: 10,500
Referee: Marcel Göpferich (Bad Schönborn)

=== Second round ===
29 October 2014
19:00

| Würzburger Kickers | 0–1 | Eintracht Braunschweig |
|---|---|---|
| | Report | Nielsen 78' |

Flyeralarm Arena, Würzburg
Attendance: 11,240
Referee: Robert Kampka (Mainz)
