= Fabian Weiß =

German footballer

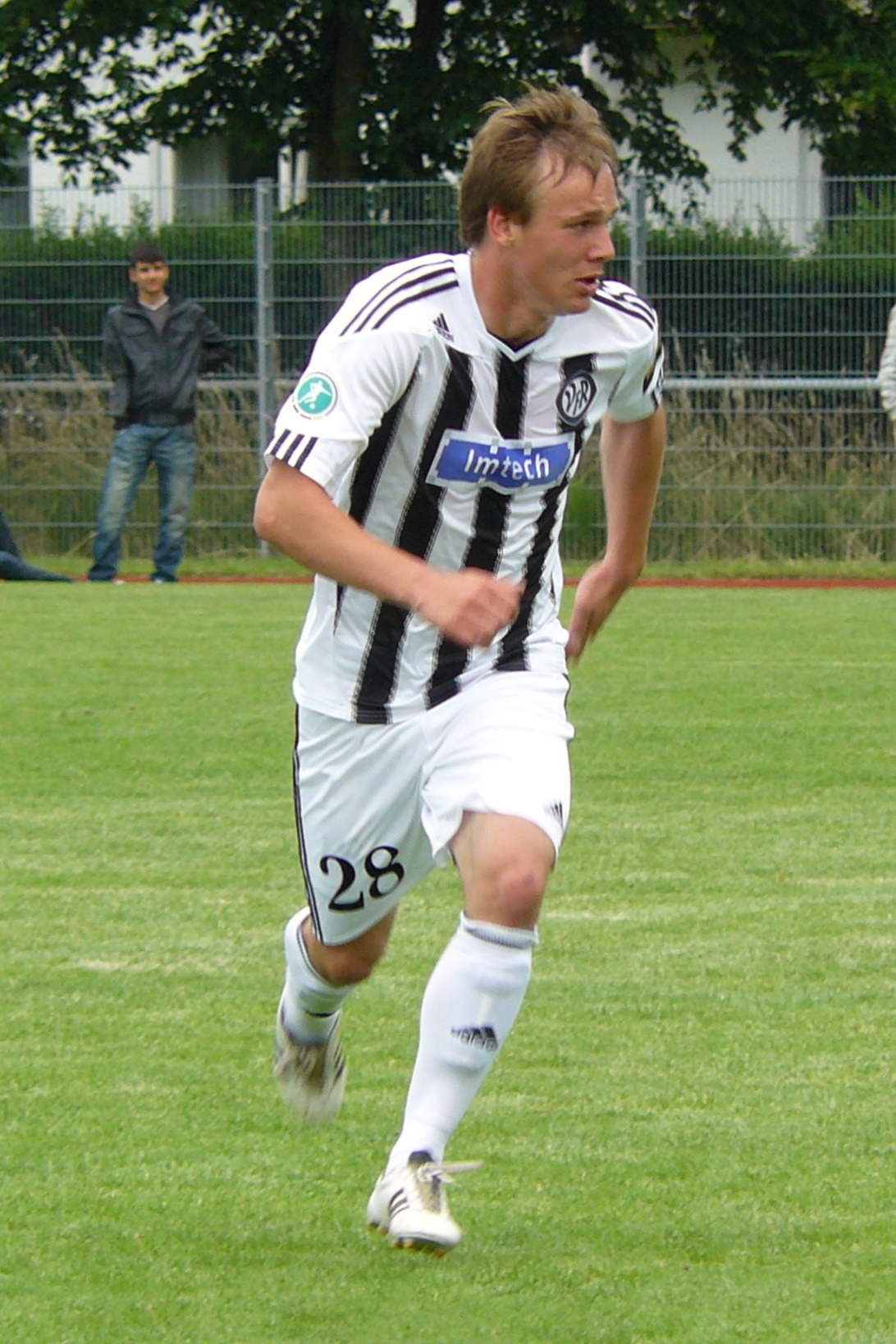
- Weiß in 2011

Personal information
- Date of birth: 23 February 1992 (age 34)
- Place of birth: Aalen, Germany
- Height: 1.76 m (5 ft 9 in)
- Position: Winger

Youth career
- –2009: VfB Stuttgart

Senior career*
Years	Team	Apps	(Gls)
2009–2015	VfR Aalen	50	(3)
2013	→ SGS Großaspach (loan)	8	(1)
2015–2016	Würzburger Kickers	9	(1)
2016–2018	Sportfreunde Dorfmerkingen	30	(16)
2018–2020	TSV Essingen	41	(9)
2020–2022	Sportfreunde Dorfmerkingen	19	(0)
- * Club domestic league appearances and goals

Fabian Weiß (born 23 February 1992) is a German former footballer who played as a winger.
