= Felix Müller =

German footballer

Personal information
- Date of birth: 27 January 1993 (age 33)
- Place of birth: Rodalben, Germany
- Height: 1.78 m (5 ft 10 in)
- Position: Defender

Youth career
- 2009–2012: 1899 Hoffenheim

Senior career*
Years	Team	Apps	(Gls)
2012–2015	Mainz 05	81	(4)
2015–2016	Preußen Münster	29	(1)
2016–2018	Würzburger Kickers	45	(5)
2018–2020	SV Sandhausen	17	(0)
2020–2021	SpVgg Unterhaching	13	(0)
2021–2022	SV Elversberg	8	(0)

International career
2009–2010	Germany U17	3	(0)
2013	Germany U20	1	(0)
- * Club domestic league appearances and goals

Felix Müller (born 27 January 1993) is a German former professional footballer who played as a defender.

== International career ==
Müller is a youth international for Germany.
