= Dominik Nothnagel =

German footballer

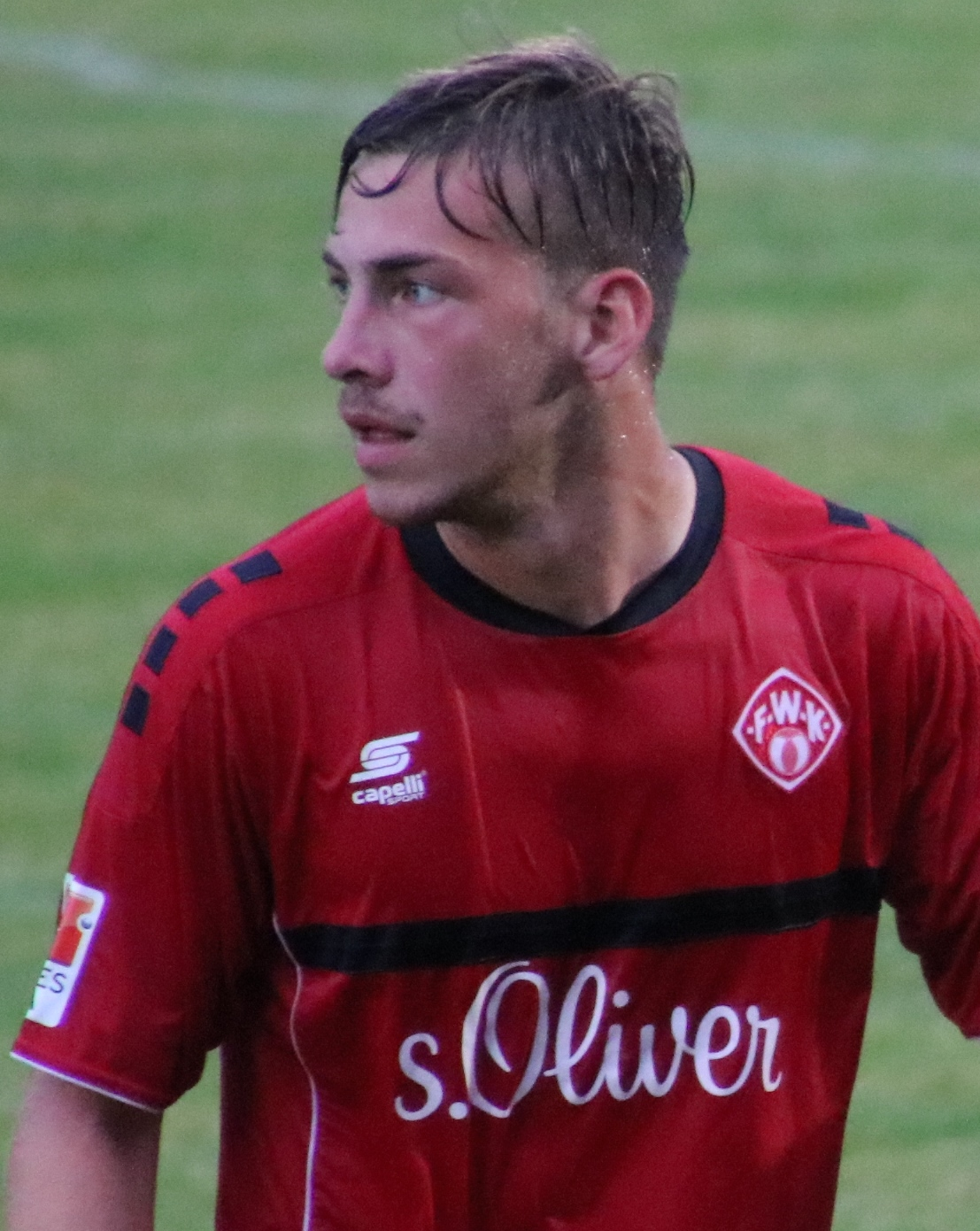

Personal information
- Date of birth: 28 December 1994 (age 31)
- Place of birth: Stuttgart, Germany
- Height: 1.84 m (6 ft 0 in)
- Position: Defensive midfielder

Team information
- Current team: VfB Stuttgart II
- Number: 29

Youth career
- 2002–2004: TSV Bernhausen
- 2004–2006: SV Bonlanden
- 2006–2012: VfB Stuttgart
- 2012–2013: Borussia Dortmund

Senior career*
Years	Team	Apps	(Gls)
2013–2014	Borussia Dortmund II	15	(0)
2014–2017	Würzburger Kickers	64	(1)
2017–2018	SV Wehen Wiesbaden	13	(0)
2018–2021	FSV Frankfurt	95	(8)
2021–	VfB Stuttgart II	167	(8)

International career
2011	Germany U18	1	(0)
- * Club domestic league appearances and goals as of 30 May 2026

Dominik Nothnagel (born 28 December 1994) is a German professional footballer who plays as a defensive midfielder for 3. Liga club VfB Stuttgart II.

In 2011, he earned a single cap for the Germany under-18 national team. He made his professional debut in the 3. Liga on 20 July 2013 for Borussia Dortmund II against VfB Stuttgart II. A year later he signed for Würzburger Kickers.
