= Dominik Brunnhübner =

German footballer

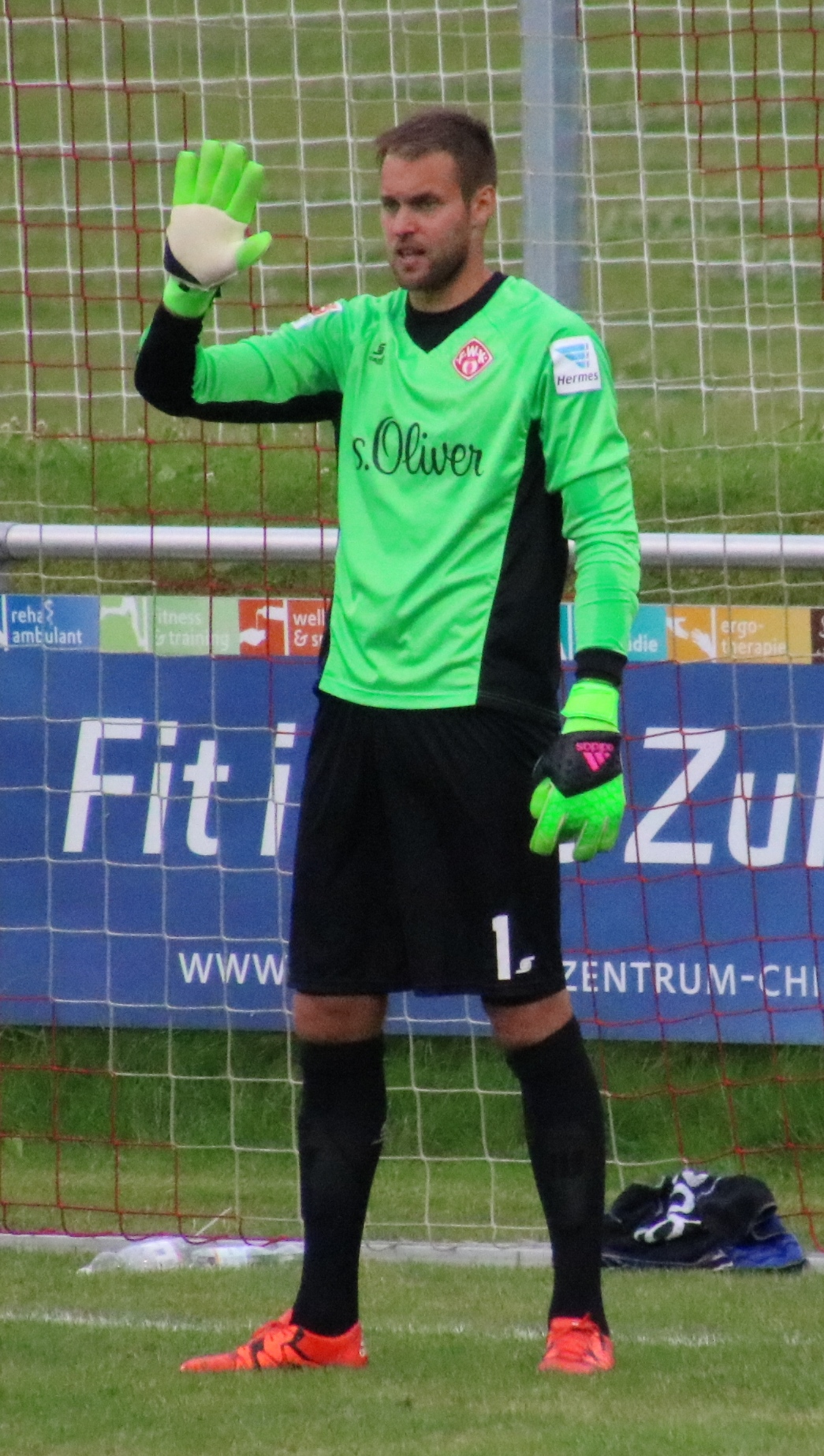

Personal information
- Full name: Dominik Brunnhübner
- Date of birth: 29 August 1990 (age 36)
- Place of birth: Neuendettelsau, Germany
- Height: 1.95 m (6 ft 5 in)
- Position: Goalkeeper

Senior career*
Years	Team	Apps	(Gls)
2009–2011	1. FC Nuremberg II	16	(0)
2012–2015	SV Seligenporten	107	(0)
2015–2017	Würzburger Kickers	2	(0)
- * Club domestic league appearances and goals as of 30 July 2017

Dominik Brunnhübner (born 29 August 1990) is a German former football goalkeeper.

== Career ==
On 30 May 2016, Brunnhübner extended his contract with Würzburger Kickers until 2018.
