= Dennis Russ =

German footballer

Personal information
- Full name: Dennis Russ
- Date of birth: 5 June 1992 (age 34)
- Place of birth: Germany
- Position: Midfielder

Senior career*
Years	Team	Apps	(Gls)
2011–2015	SC Freiburg II	81	(3)
2015–2017	Würzburger Kickers	17	(1)
2017	FSV Frankfurt	7	(0)
- * Club domestic league appearances and goals as of 02:52, 6 January 2017 (UTC)

Dennis Russ (born 5 June 1992) is a German football midfielder.
