= Nico Gutjahr =

German footballer

Personal information
- Date of birth: 15 May 1993 (age 33)
- Place of birth: Germany
- Height: 1.80 m (5 ft 11 in)
- Position: Midfielder

Team information
- Current team: Bahlinger SC
- Number: 31

Senior career*
Years	Team	Apps	(Gls)
2012–2014	SC Freiburg II	13	(0)
2014–2016	Würzburger Kickers	24	(4)
2016–2018	Sonnenhof Großaspach	7	(1)
2018–2020	Ulm	49	(2)
2020–	Bahlinger SC	121	(1)
- * Club domestic league appearances and goals as of 1 January 2025

Nico Gutjahr (German pronunciation: [ˈniːko ˈɡuːtjaːɐ̯]; born 15 May 1993) is a German football midfielder who plays for Bahlinger SC in the Regionalliga Südwest.
