= 2015–16 Bavarian Cup =

Tournament details
- Country: Germany
- Teams: 64

Final positions
- Champions: Würzburger Kickers
- Runners-up: SpVgg Unterhaching
- DFB-Pokal: 2016–17 DFB-Pokal

Tournament statistics
- Top goal scorer(s): Adam Jabiri, Michael Pillmeier, Amir Shapourzadeh (6 goals)

The 2015–16 Bavarian Cup (German: Bayerischer Toto-Pokal 2015–16) was the nineteenth edition of this competition, first held in 1998 and organised by the Bavarian Football Association (BFV). The winner qualified for the first round of the 2016–17 DFB-Pokal, the German Cup.

The competition is open to all senior men's football teams playing within the Bavarian football league system and the 3. Liga. The final was played on 28 May and won by Würzburger Kickers, defeating SpVgg Unterhaching 6–2 in the final.

As Würzburg had already qualified for the German Cup though it's 3. Liga third-place finish runners-up Unterhaching took up their qualifying spot through the Bavarian Cup. For the first round of the 2016–17 DFB-Pokal Würzburg drew 2. Bundesliga club Eintracht Braunschweig while Unterhaching drew Bundesliga side FSV Mainz 05.

== History ==
The Bavarian Cup, officially referred to as the Bayerischer Toto-Pokal for sponsorship reasons, was established in 1998. Until 2009 it was contested by only eight clubs, qualified through the seven annual regional cup competitions. Since 2009 the Bavarian Cup has been expanded to include 64 teams in the first round.

The defending champions were SpVgg Unterhaching who defeated SpVgg SV Weiden in the 2014–15 final and thereby won the competition for a third time after 2007–08 and 2011–12.

== Rules and regulations ==
The competition is open to all member clubs of the Bavarian Football Association except the clubs playing in the Bundesliga and 2. Bundesliga. Reserve teams are also barred from the competition. The Bavarian clubs from the 3. Liga and Regionalliga Bayern and the 24 District Cup (Kreispokale) winners qualified directly for the first round of the competition, as were the 2014–15 Bayernliga champions and the two participants in the Regionalliga qualification round. The remaining clubs from the two divisions of the Bayernliga and the five divisions of the Landesliga Bayern entered the qualifying stage of the competition. Clubs below the Landesliga had to take part in the Kreispokale to qualify. The 2014–15 edition was the last one to feature three qualifying rounds as, from 2015–16 onwards, only two qualifying rounds were held, taking place just before the first round proper. Only the Bayernliga clubs and the best ten clubs from each Landesliga division took part in this.

For the 2015–16 edition this meant, with league membership in the 2014–15 season taken as reference, the two Bavarian 3. Liga clubs, the 12 Regionalliga Bayern clubs that were not reserve sides and four Bayernliga clubs where automatically qualified. Additionally the 24 Kreispokal winners and 22 clubs qualified through the three rounds of qualifying entered the first round of the Bavarian Cup. The 24 Kreispokal winners, after being allocated to their respective region, were permitted to select the team they wished to play against rather than having a club drawn against them.

The winner of the 2015–16 Bavarian Cup was automatically qualified for the first round of the German Cup the following season. The second spot awarded to the Bavarian Football Association for the first round of the German Cup will go to the best-placed non-reserve side in the Regionalliga Bayern. Should the same team win the cup and finished as the best non-reserve side in the Regionalliga or qualify automatically as one of the top four teams in the 3. Liga the second spot would have gone to the losing finalist. Should the losing finalist also have qualified already as one of the top four 3. Liga clubs a decider would be played between the two losing semi finalists.

Because winners Würzburger Kickers qualified to the DFB-Pokal through their third-place finish in the 3. Liga Unterhaching took up their Cup winners spot in the 2016–17 DFB-Pokal while Regionalliga Bayern champions Jahn Regensburg qualified through the league path.

== Schedule ==
The first and second qualifying round were played between 1 and 14 July 2015. The draw for the first round was carried out on 31 July, before the 2. Bundesliga game of 1. FC Nürnberg versus 1. FC Heidenheim.

The dates set originally for the various rounds by the BFV were:

- First round: 12 August 2015
- Second round: 19 August 2015
- Round of sixteen: 2 September 2015
- Quarter finals: 6 April 2016
- Semi finals: 20 April 2016
- Final: 28 May 2016

== 2015–16 season ==
The games of the 2015–16 edition:

=== First round ===
The first round, played between 4 and 12 August 2015:

Home team	Away team	Score
SpVgg Haidhausen (7)(K)	SC Fürstenfeldbruck (6)	4–2
SSV Wertach (10)(K)	SpVgg Unterhaching (4)	0–7
Kissinger SC (6)(K)	FC Pipinsried (5)	0–2
FF Geretsried (8)(K)	FC Deisenhofen (6)	0–4
SpVgg Kaufbeuren (6)	FC Memmingen (4)	1–3
TSV Landsberg (5)	FV Illertissen (4)	4–0
TSV Wemding (7)(K)	TSV Rain am Lech (4)	2–7
ASV Zirndorf (7)(K)	FSV Stadeln (6)	0–2
SK Lauf (7)(K)	SV Seligenporten (5)	0–1
SC 04 Schwabach (7)(K)	FC Gundelfingen (6)	1–4
FC Hepberg (8)(K)	1. SC Feucht (5)	1–8
TSV Neustadt/Aisch (6)	SC Eltersdorf (5)	0–0 (3–4 pen)
FC Teutonia Reichenbach (8)(K)	Würzburger Kickers (3)	0–6
1. FC Oberhaid (7)(K)	FC Eintracht Bamberg (5)	1–3
SV Euerbach/Kützberg (6)(K)	TSV Großbardorf (5)	1–2
TSV Keilberg (7)(K)	Viktoria Aschaffenburg (4)	1–1 (4–6 pen)
Dettelbach und Ortsteile (8)(K)	TSV Abtswind (6)	0–2
TSV Karlburg (6)	1. FC Schweinfurt 05 (4)	0–3
SpVgg Hainsacker (7)(K)	SSV Jahn Regensburg (4)	0–5
SV Sorghof (7)(K)	FC Amberg (4)	0–3
ZV Thierstein (7)(K)	SpVgg Selbitz (6)	1–1 (7–8 pen)
SC Sylvia Ebersdorf (8)(K)	SpVgg Bayreuth (4)	0–4
FC Chammünster (8)(K)	SpVgg SV Weiden (5)	0–8
TSV Neudrossenfeld (6)	ASV Burglengenfeld (5)	9–1
TSV Vilsbiburg (7)(K)	TSV Buchbach (4)	1–3
TSV Kößlarn (8)(K)	SV Wacker Burghausen (4)	0–3
SV Ostermünchen (8)(K)	SV Schalding-Heining (4)	1–8
FC Sturm Hauzenberg (6)(K)	TSV Waldkirchen (6)	2–2 (8–7 pen)
FSV Landau/Isar (9)(K)	SpVgg Ruhmannsfelden (5)	1–2
VfR Garching (5)	SV Heimstetten (5)	1–1 (1–4 pen)
SpVgg Landshut (6)	FC Unterföhring (5)	2–2 (6–5 pen)
FC Ismaning (6)	TuS Holzkirchen (6)	2–1

=== Second round ===
The second round, played on 18 and 19 August 2015:

Home team	Away team	Score
SpVgg Haidhausen (7)(K)	FC Pipinsried (5)	1–0
FC Deisenhofen (6)	FC Memmingen (4)	0–2
TSV Landsberg (5)	SpVgg Unterhaching (4)	1–3
FSV Stadeln (6)	SC Eltersdorf (5)	0–1
FC Gundelfingen (6)	1. SC Freucht (5)	1–1 (5–3 pen)
SV Seligenporten (5)	TSV Rain am Lech (4)	1–0
TSV Abtswind (6)	Viktoria Aschaffenburg (4)	1–3
TSV Großbardorf (5)	Würzburger Kickers (3)	0–4
FC Eintracht Bamberg (5)	1. FC Schweinfurt 05 (4)	3–2
TSV Neudrossenfeld (6)	SSV Jahn Regensburg (4)	0–1
SpVgg Selbitz (6)	SpVgg Bayreuth (4)	0–1
SpVgg SV Weiden (5)	FC Amberg (4)	0–2
FC Sturm Hauzenberg (6)(K)	SV Schalding-Heining (4)	1–6
FC Ismaning (6)	SpVgg Ruhmannsfelden (5)	1–2
SpVgg Landshut (6)	SV Wacker Burghausen (4)	0–5
SV Heimstetten (5)	TSV Buchbach (4)	2–3

=== Round of sixteen ===
The round of sixteen, played between 1 September and 6 October 2015:

Home team	Away team	Score
SC Eltersdorf (5)	Viktoria Aschaffenburg (4)	3–1
SSV Jahn Regensburg (4)	FC Amberg (4)	2–2 (6–4 pen)
FC Gundelfingen (6)	FC Memmingen (4)	0–1
SpVgg Ruhmannsfelden (5)	TSV Buchbach (4)	0–3
SV Wacker Burghausen (4)	SV Schalding-Heining (4)	2–3
SpVgg Haidhausen (7)(K)	SpVgg Unterhaching (4)	0–7
SV Seligenporten (5)	SpVgg Bayreuth (4)	5–0
FC Eintracht Bamberg (5)	Würzburger Kickers (3)	2–3

=== Quarter finals ===
The quarter finals, played between 30 March and 6 April 2016:

Home team	Away team	Score
SC Eltersdorf (5)	SSV Jahn Regensburg (4)	1–3
SV Seligenporten (5)	SpVgg Unterhaching (4)	1–3
TSV Buchbach (4)	FC Memmingen (4)	2–4
SV Schalding-Heining (4)	Würzburger Kickers (3)	1–2

=== Semi finals ===
The semi finals played on 19 and 20 April 2016:

Home team	Away team	Score
SSV Jahn Regensburg (4)	SpVgg Unterhaching (4)	1–5
FC Memmingen (4)	Würzburger Kickers (3)	0–3

=== Final ===
The final, to be played on 28 May 2016:

Home team	Away team	Score
SpVgg Unterhaching (4)	Würzburger Kickers (3)	2–6

=== Key ===
Symbol	League
(3)	3. Liga
(4)	Regionalliga Bayern
(5)	Bayernliga
(6)	Landesliga
(7)	Bezirksliga
(8)	Kreisliga
(9)	Kreisklasse
(10)	A-Klasse
(K)	District Cup winner
