= Nejmeddin Daghfous =

German-born Tunisian footballer

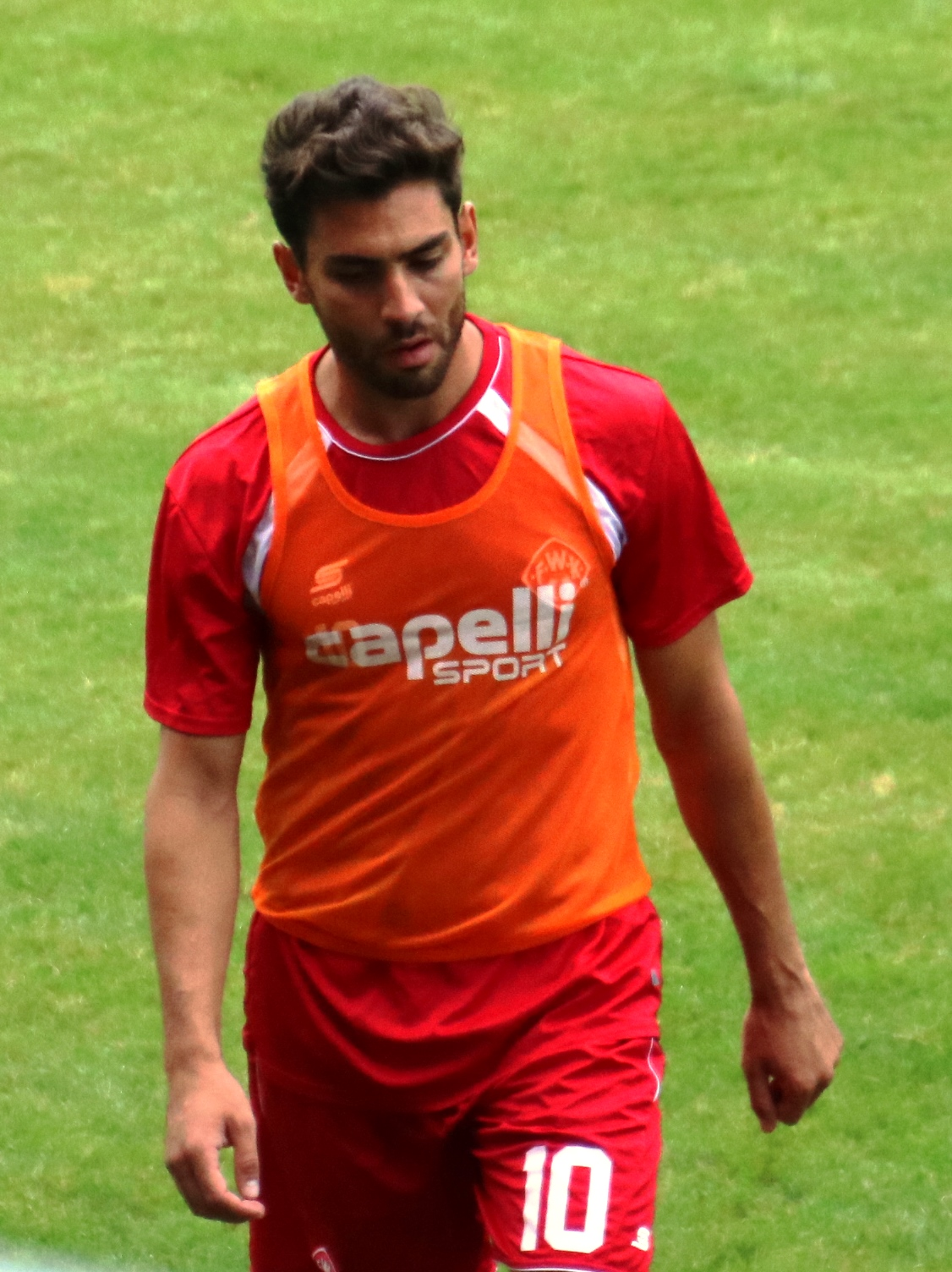
- Daghfous with Würzburger Kickers in 2016

Personal information
- Date of birth: 1 October 1986 (age 40)
- Place of birth: Kassel, West Germany
- Height: 1.78 m (5 ft 10 in)
- Position: Midfielder

Youth career
- 1. FC Oberzwehren
- –2001: TSV Wolfsanger
- 2001–2005: KSV Baunatal

Senior career*
Years	Team	Apps	(Gls)
2005–2006	KSV Baunatal	38	(8)
2006–2009	Mainz 05 II	67	(28)
2007–2008	Mainz 05	16	(0)
2009–2011	SC Paderborn	33	(1)
2011–2012	Preußen Münster	15	(0)
2012–2014	Mainz 05 II	45	(15)
2013–2014	Mainz 05	1	(0)
2014–2015	VfR Aalen	29	(2)
2015–2017	Würzburger Kickers	59	(5)
2017–2019	SV Sandhausen	37	(2)
2019–2021	Kickers Offenbach	21	(6)
2021–2022	FC Gießen	26	(2)
Total		387	(69)

International career
2006	Germany U20	1	(0)
- * Club domestic league appearances and goals

Nejmeddin Daghfous (born 1 October 1986) is a former professional footballer who played as a midfielder.

== Club career ==
Daghfous made his debut on the professional league level in the 2. Bundesliga for 1. FSV Mainz 05 on 21 October 2007, coming on as a substitute in the 78th minute in a game against Wehen Wiesbaden. He made his Bundesliga debut on 11 May 2013 against Borussia Mönchengladbach replacing Yunus Mallı in the 78th minute.

In late January 2014, Daghfous signed an 18-month contract with 2. Bundesliga side VfR Aalen.

In June 2017, he left Würzburger Kickers following their relegation from 2. Bundesliga and joined SV Sandhausen one a two-year contract with the option of a further year. In June 2019, Daghfous joined Kickers Offenbach on a two-year contract.

In summer 2022, following his release by FC Gießen, Daghfous retired from playing.

== International career ==
Daghfous was called up to the Tunisia national team for a 2018 World Cup qualification match against Guinea in September 2016.
