= Richard Weil (footballer) =

German footballer

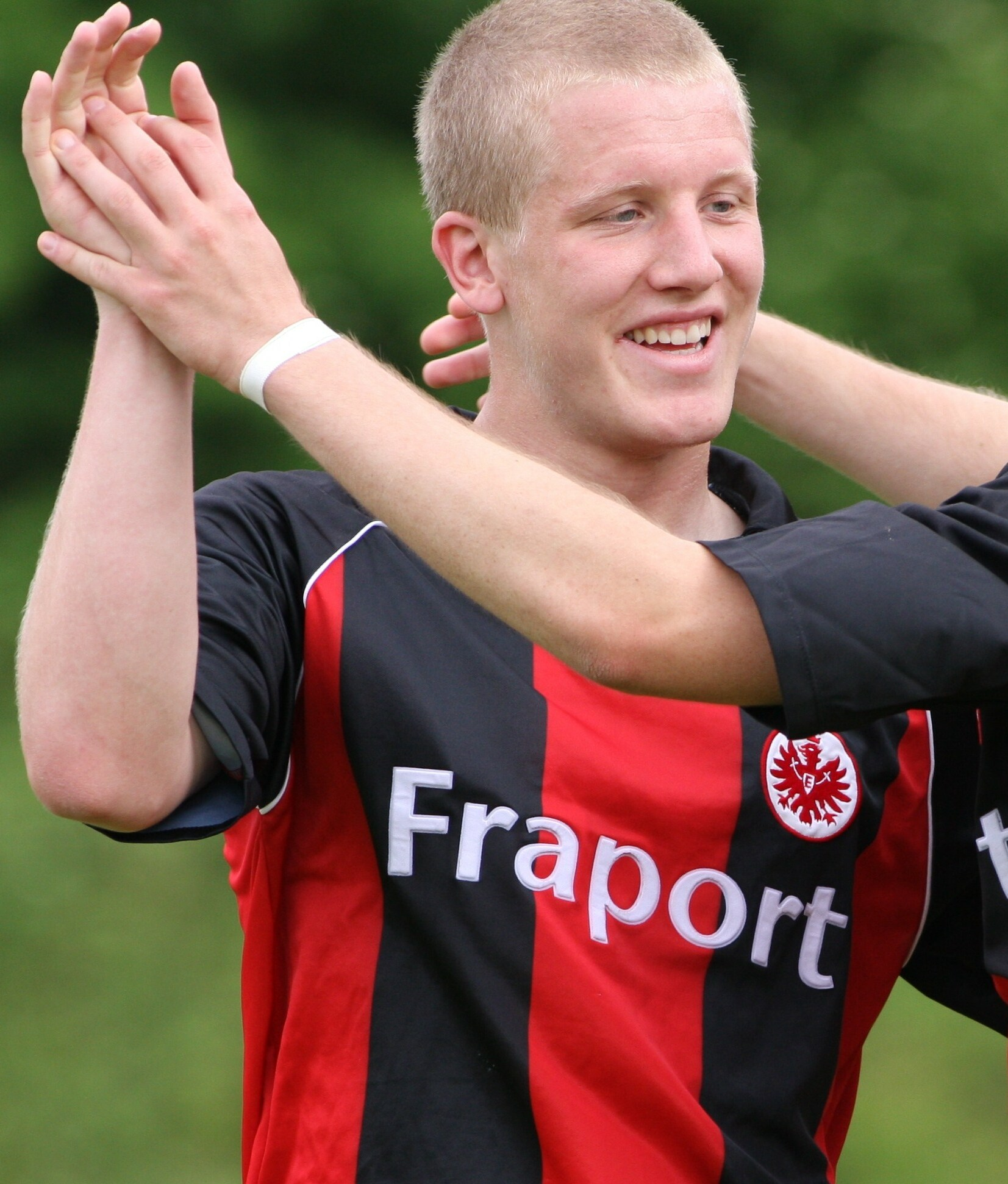
- Weil with Eintracht Frankfurt II in 2008

Personal information
- Date of birth: 6 February 1988 (age 38)
- Place of birth: Frankfurt, West Germany
- Height: 1.83 m (6 ft 0 in)
- Position: Midfielder

Team information
- Current team: FSV 1926 Fernwald
- Number: 17

Youth career
- –2007: Eintracht Frankfurt

Senior career*
| Years | Team | Apps | (Gls) |
| 2007–2009 | Eintracht Frankfurt II | 62 | (20) |
| 2009–2013 | Heidenheim | 95 | (13) |
| 2013–2015 | Mainz 05 II | 76 | (6) |
| 2015–2017 | Würzburger Kickers | 43 | (4) |
| 2017–2019 | Magdeburg | 56 | (5) |
| 2019–2020 | Kickers Offenbach | 14 | (1) |
| 2020–2022 | VfB Stuttgart II | 65 | (4) |
| 2022–2024 | VfR Mannheim | 26 | (3) |
| 2024 | Fortuna Heddesheim | 11 | (0) |
| 2024– | FSV 1926 Fernwald | 1 | (0) |

Managerial career
- 2022–2024: VfR Mannheim (player-assistant)
- * Club domestic league appearances and goals as of 27 July 2024

Richard Weil (born 6 February 1988) is a German professional footballer who plays as a central midfielder for FSV 1926 Fernwald in the Hessenliga.

== Career ==
On 3 June 2019, Weil joined Kickers Offenbach on a two-year contract. He then had two season for VfB Stuttgart II, before joining VfR Mannheim in June 2022 as a playing assistant coach.
