= Marco Haller (footballer) =

German footballer

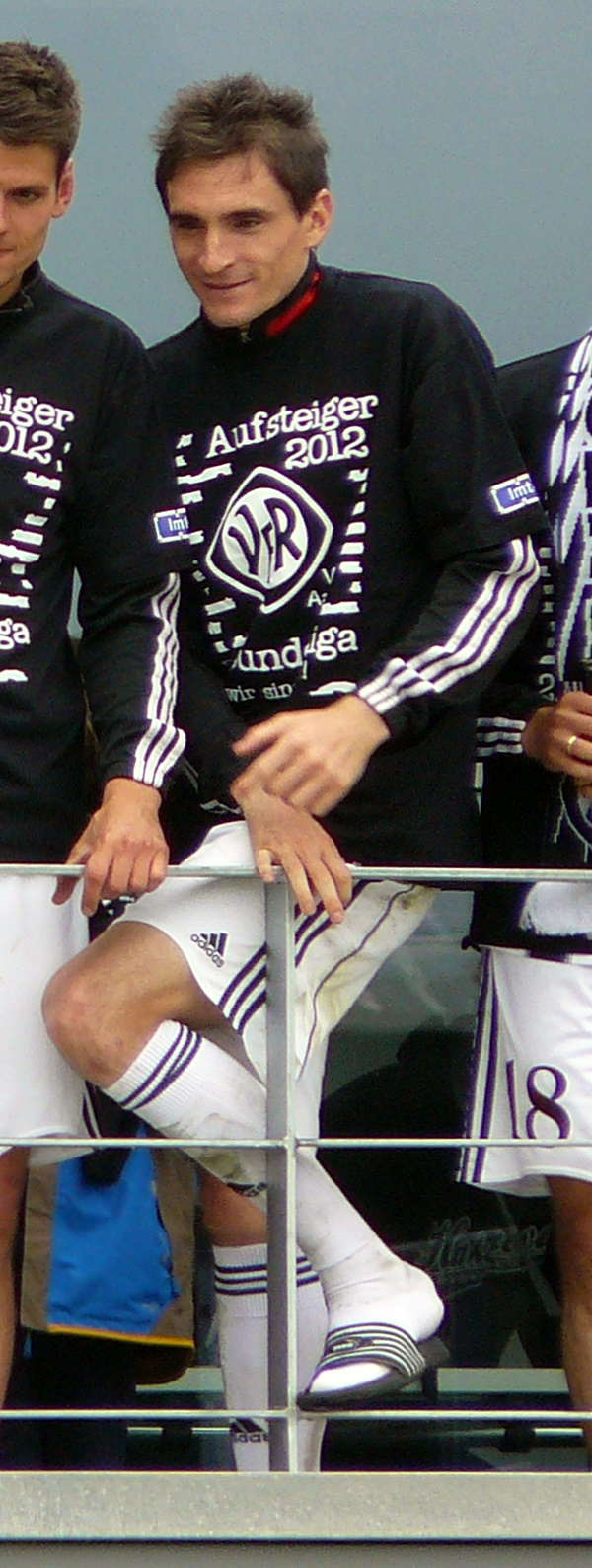
- Marco Haller at the VfR Aalen promotion ceremony on 5 May 2012

Personal information
- Full name: Marco Haller
- Date of birth: 30 June 1984 (age 42)
- Place of birth: Oettingen, West Germany
- Height: 1.81 m (5 ft 11 in)
- Position: Midfielder

Youth career
- TSV Wemding
- TSV Nördlingen
- –2001: 1. FC Nürnberg
- 2001–2003: FC Augsburg

Senior career*
Years	Team	Apps	(Gls)
2003–2004	FC Augsburg	14	(1)
2004–2009	VfR Aalen	123	(4)
2009–2011	Jahn Regensburg	65	(10)
2011–2013	VfR Aalen	56	(6)
2013–2016	Würzburger Kickers	81	(14)
2016–2017	1. FC Schweinfurt 05	31	(3)
2017–2019	Sportfreunde Dorfmerkingen	55	(3)
2019–2020	TSV Nördlingen	19	(6)
Total		444	(47)
- * Club domestic league appearances and goals

Marco Haller (born 30 June 1984) is a German retired footballer who played as a midfielder.

== Career ==
On 30 May 2016, Haller extended his contract with Würzburger Kickers until 2017.
