= Clemens Schoppenhauer =

German footballer

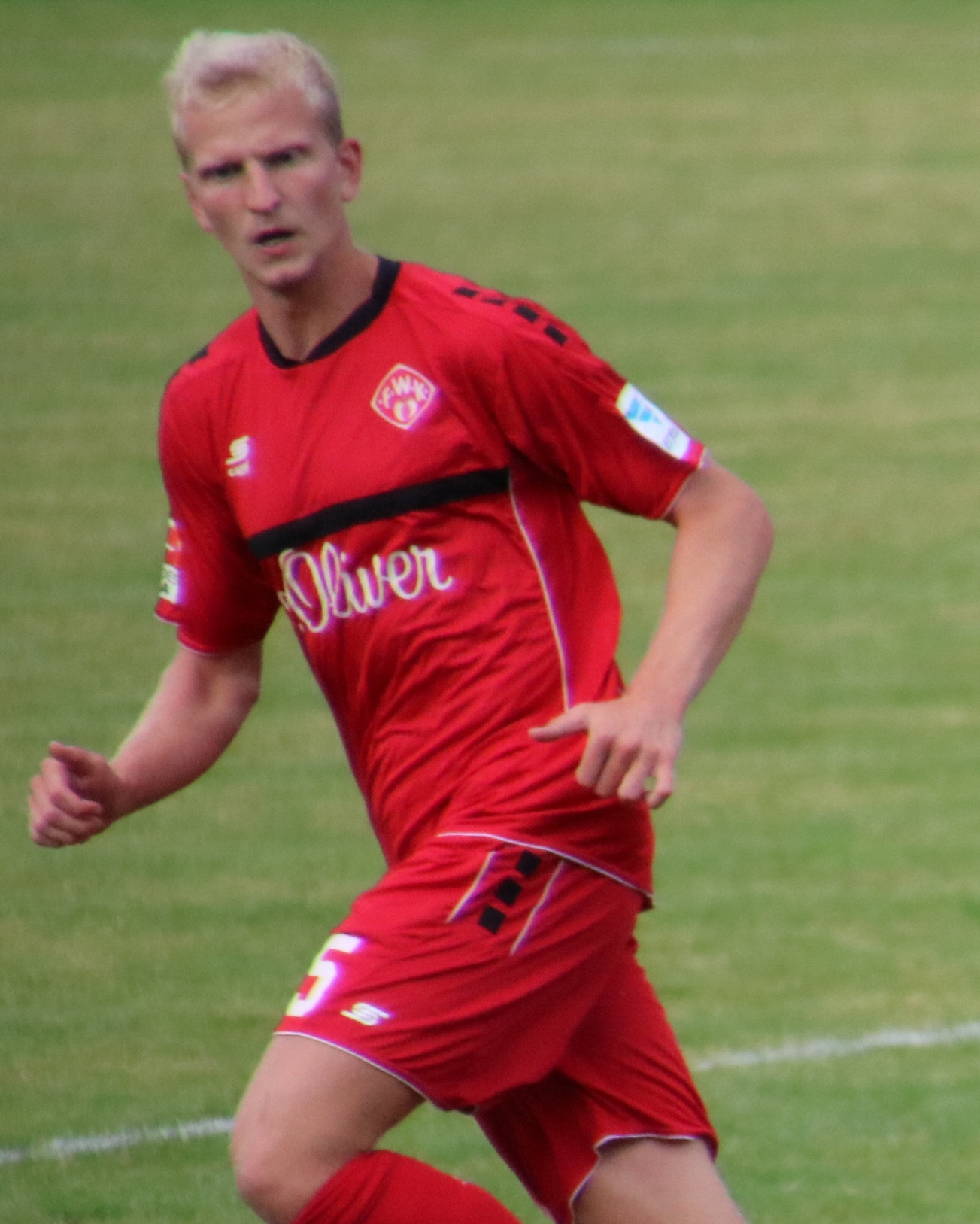
- Schoppenhauer playing for Würzburger Kickers in 2016

Personal information
- Date of birth: 23 February 1992 (age 34)
- Place of birth: Bremerhaven, Germany
- Height: 1.85 m (6 ft 1 in)
- Position: Centre-back

Youth career
- 1998–2002: SG Stotel-Nesse
- 2002–2005: JSG Weser-Stotel
- 2005–2010: Werder Bremen

Senior career*
Years	Team	Apps	(Gls)
2010–2014	Werder Bremen II	83	(1)
2014–2017	Würzburger Kickers	95	(3)
2017–2019	FC St. Pauli	2	(0)
2019	VfR Aalen	17	(1)
2019–2020	Chemnitzer FC	9	(0)
2020–2021	FC Oberneuland	10	(0)
Total		216	(5)

International career
2011	Germany U-20	1	(0)
- * Club domestic league appearances and goals

Clemens Schoppenhauer (born 23 February 1992) is a German former professional footballer who played as a centre-back.

== Career ==
In 2005, Schoppenhauer joined SV Werder Bremen as a youth and went on to progress through the club's youth teams. From 2010 until 2014, he played for the reserves. In 2010, he was called up to the first-team squad for a Champions League match against Tottenham Hotspur.

In May 2017, Schoppenhauer signed a two-year contract with FC St. Pauli.

On 5 January 2019, Schoppenhauer joined VfR Aalen on a one-and-half year deal.

In July 2019, Schoppenhauer moved to Bremen-based club FC Oberneuland, newly promoted to the Regionalliga Nord.

He announced his retirement from playing in May 2021.
