= Christopher Bieber =

German footballer

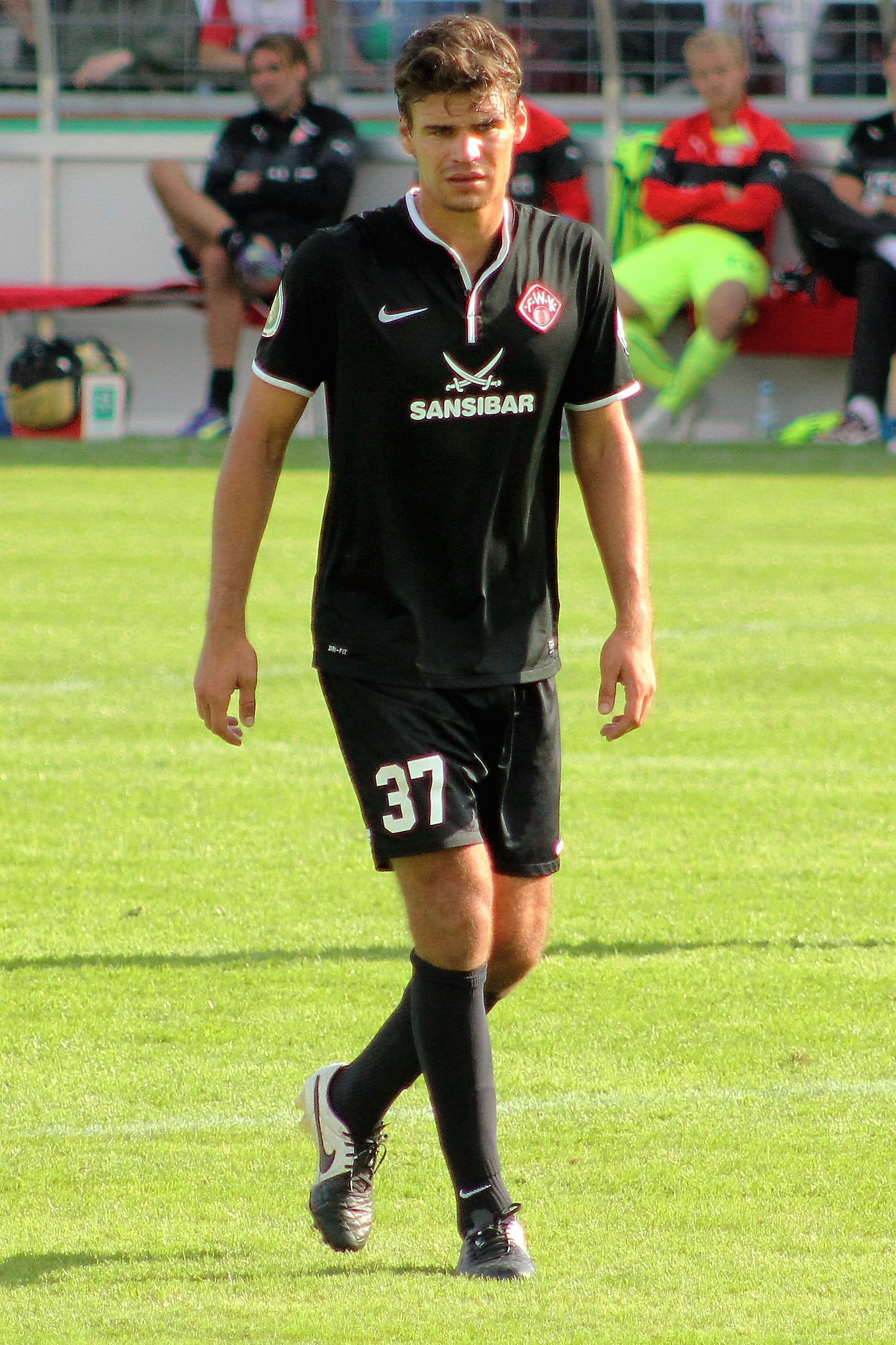
- Bieber in 2014

Personal information
- Date of birth: 3 July 1989 (age 37)
- Place of birth: Bad Mergentheim, West Germany
- Height: 1.96 m (6 ft 5 in)
- Position: Forward

Youth career
- 2006–2007: Karlsruher SC

Senior career*
Years	Team	Apps	(Gls)
2007–2010	Karlsruher SC II	54	(4)
2009–2011	Karlsruher SC	2	(0)
2011–2012	FC Oss	28	(10)
2012–2016	Würzburger Kickers	119	(50)
2016–2018	Rot-Weiß Erfurt	54	(4)
2018–2019	SG Barockstadt Fulda-Lehnerz	23	(9)
2019–2024	TSV Aubstadt	92	(17)
- * Club domestic league appearances and goals

Christopher Bieber (born 3 July 1989) is a German footballer who most recently played for TSV Aubstadt in the Regionalliga Bayern.

Bieber made his debut for Karlsruher SC on 5 February 2010, in a 2–1 away defeat against St. Pauli, after he came off the bench to replace Lars Stindl on the 82 minute. After two seasons with Karlsruhe's first team, Bieber moved abroad to Dutch FC Oss.
