= Amir Shapourzadeh =

Iranian-born German footballer

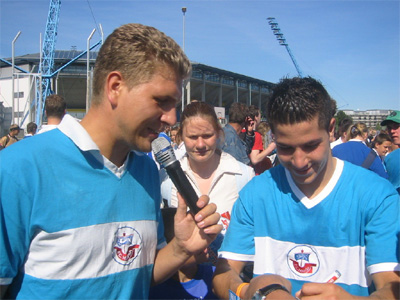
- Shapourzadeh (right) at Hansa Rostock

Personal information
- Full name: Amir-Hossein Shapourzadeh
- Date of birth: 19 September 1982 (age 44)
- Place of birth: Tehran, Iran
- Height: 1.79 m (5 ft 10 in)
- Position: Forward

Team information
- Current team: Admira Wacker (business manager)

Youth career
- 1994–1999: Grün-Weiß Eimsbüttel
- 1999–2001: Niendorfer TSV

Senior career*
Years	Team	Apps	(Gls)
2001–2002	Eimsbütteler TV	33	(13)
2002–2004	Hamburger SV II	29	(2)
2004–2007	Hansa Rostock II	50	(25)
2005–2008	Hansa Rostock	54	(4)
2008–2009	FSV Frankfurt	23	(2)
2009–2012	Steel Azin	50	(4)
2012	Kickers Offenbach	8	(0)
2012	Kickers Offenbach II	1	(0)
2012–2014	Sportfreunde Lotte	61	(16)
2014–2016	Würzburger Kickers	63	(18)

International career
2007–2008	Iran B	4	(0)
2008	Iran	1	(0)

Managerial career
- 2016: Würzburger Kickers (sporting director)
- 2017–: Admira Wacker (business manager)
- * Club domestic league appearances and goals

Amir Shapourzadeh (Persian: امیر شاپورزاده; born 19 September 1982) is a former footballer who played as a forward, and is the business manager of Admira Wacker. Born in Iran and raised in Germany, Shapourzadeh made one appearance for the Iran national team.

== Club career ==
Shapourzadeh started his career at Grün-Weiß Eimsbüttel and Niendorfer SV youth clubs, before moving on to Eimsbütteler TV, his first senior side, In 2002 Hamburger SV signed him, but he only played for their amateur side, He was transferred to the amateur side of Hansa Rostock where he built himself up the ranks until he reached the first team, Shapourzadeh signed than after three years with Hansa Rostock in July 2008 for FSV Frankfurt and before joining Iranian side Steel Azin F.C. in July 2009.

== International career ==
Shapourzadeh was called up to the Iran national team's B squad for the 2007 West Asian Football Federation Championship and debuted in 0–0 draw versus Iraq on 16 June 2007. He was again called up to the national team in May 2008 for a friendly against Zambia in which he appeared as a second half substitution.

== Career statistics ==
Appearances and goals by club, season and competition
Club	Season	League			Cup		Other		Total	
Club	Season	Division	Apps	Goals	Apps	Goals	Apps	Goals	Apps	Goals
Eimsbütteler TV	2001–02	Oberliga Hamburg	33	13	0	0	–		33	13
Hamburger SV II	2002–03	Regionalliga Nord	25	2	0	0	–		25	2
Hamburger SV II	2003–04	Regionalliga Nord	4	0	0	0	–		4	0
Hamburger SV II	Total		29	2	0	0	0	0	29	2
Hansa Rostock II	2003–04	NOFV-Oberliga Nord	11	0	0	0	–		11	0
Hansa Rostock II	2004–05	NOFV-Oberliga Nord	30	21	0	0	–		30	21
Hansa Rostock II	2005–06	NOFV-Oberliga Nord	5	2	1	0	–		6	2
Hansa Rostock II	2007–08	NOFV-Oberliga Nord	4	2	0	0	–		4	2
Hansa Rostock II	Total		50	25	1	0	0	0	51	25
Hansa Rostock	2004–05	Bundesliga	1	0	0	0	–		1	0
Hansa Rostock	2005–06	2. Bundesliga	11	0	1	0	–		12	0
Hansa Rostock	2006–07	2. Bundesliga	27	4	1	0	–		28	4
Hansa Rostock	2007–08	Bundesliga	15	0	1	0	–		16	0
Hansa Rostock	Total		54	4	3	0	0	0	57	4
FSV Frankfurt	2008–09	2. Bundesliga	23	2	2	0	–		25	2
Steel Azin	2009–10	Persian Gulf Cup	30	4			–		30	4
Steel Azin	2010–11	Persian Gulf Cup	20	0	1	1	–		21	1
Steel Azin	2011–12	Azadegan League	0	0	0	0	–		0	0
Steel Azin	Total		50	4			0	0	51	5
Kickers Offenbach	2011–12	3. Liga	8	0	0	0	1	0	9	0
Kickers Offenbach II	2011–12	Hessenliga	1	0	0	0	–		1	0
Sportfreunde Lotte	2012–13	Regionalliga West	34	7	0	0	1	0	35	7
Sportfreunde Lotte	2013–14	Regionalliga West	27	9	0	0	–		27	9
Sportfreunde Lotte	Total		61	16	0	0	1	1	62	16
Würzburger Kickers	2014–15	Regionalliga Bayern	31	10	2	0	2	0	35	10
Würzburger Kickers	2015–16	3. Liga	31	8	1	0	1	0	33	8
Würzburger Kickers	2016–17	2. Bundesliga	1	0	0	0	–		1	0
Würzburger Kickers	Total		63	18	3	0	3	0	69	18
Career total			372	84	10	1	5	1	387	86
