= Sportfreunde Dorfmerkingen =

German football club

- Full name: Sportfreunde Dorfmerkingen 1922 e.V.
- Founded: 1922
- Ground: Sportanlage Felsenstraße; Neresheim-Dorfmerkingen, Baden-Württemberg
- Capacity: 5,000
- Head Coach: Helmut Dietterle
- League: Oberliga Baden-Württemberg (V)
- 2018–19: Verbandsliga Württemberg (VI), 1st (promoted)
- Website: http://www.sf-dorfmerkingen.de/
Home colours	Away colours

Sportfreunde Dorfmerkingen are an association football club from the Dorfmerkingen neighborhood of Neresheim, Baden-Württemberg. The club has around 500 members.

== History ==
The club was founded in 1922 and played in lower-level amateur leagues up until the 1990s. In 1997, they were promoted to the Verbandsliga Württemberg for the first time and managed to become runners-up in their first season. In the promotion play-offs to the Oberliga Baden-Württemberg they won the deciding match against Durlach and were promoted to the Oberliga for the first time in their history. In the same year, the club won the WFV-Pokal and thereby qualified for the first round of the 1998–99 DFB-Pokal, where they lost 3–0 to Stuttgarter Kickers. After one year in the Oberliga they were relegated back to the Verbandsliga.

In 2000 the Sportfreunde Dorfmerkingen won the Verbandsliga and were again promoted to the Oberliga Baden-Württemberg. They stayed there until their relegation in 2003. After a further relegation from the Verbandsliga in 2007, the club played in the seventh-tier Landesliga Württemberg, Division 2, until they were promoted in 2017. They won the Verbandsliga Württemberg title in 2019 to return to the fifth-level Oberliga Baden-Württemberg.

== Honors ==
- Verbandsliga Württemberg
  - Champions: 2000, 2019
- WFV-Pokal
  - Champions: 1998, 2017
- Participation in the DFB-Pokal
  - 1998–99, 2017–18
