= Akon Arena =

Football stadium in Würzburg, Germany

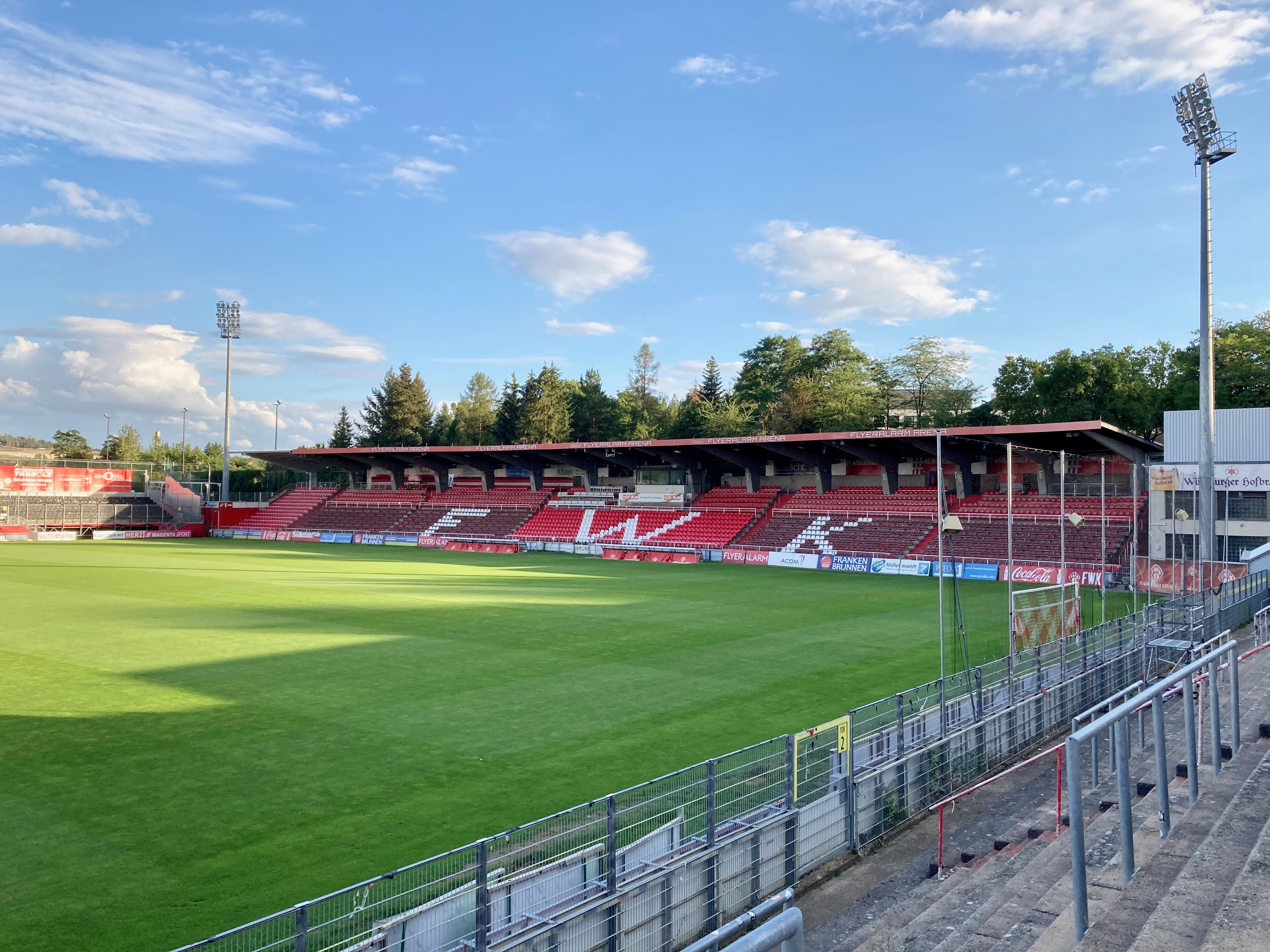
- Interactive map of Akon Arena
- Former names: Kickers-Stadion am Dallenberg, Flyeralarm-Arena
- Location: Würzburg, Germany
- Coordinates: 49°46′1.33″N 9°55′58.41″E
- Owner: FC Würzburger Kickers e. V.
- Capacity: 13,090 (13,080 attendance record)
- Surface: Grass

Construction
- Opened: 1967
- Expanded: 2016
- Architect: Jupp Schunk

Tenant
- Würzburger Kickers

Akon Arena is a football stadium in Würzburg, Germany. Würzburger Kickers use this stadium for their home games. Stadium capacity is 13,090, of which 2,562 seats.

== History ==
The stadium was opened in 1967 and renamed to Akon Arena due to sponsorship reasons in 2023. It has been equipped with floodlights in 2014 in order to meet the requirements for the club's DFB-Pokal appearance.

== Facilities ==
The whole stadium complex consists of two grass fields and one artificial field.
