= FC Würzburger Kickers =

Würzburger Kickers
- Full name: Fußball-Club Würzburger Kickers e.V.
- Nickname: Rothosen (Red Shorts)
- Founded: 17 November 1907; 118 years ago
- Ground: Akon Arena
- Capacity: 13,090
- President: Michael Grieger
- Manager: Michael Schiele
- League: 3. Liga
- 2025–26: Regionalliga Bayern, 1st of 18 (promoted via play-off)
- Website: www.wuerzburger-kickers.de
Home colours	Away colours

Fußball-Club Würzburger Kickers e.V. is a German association football club playing in Würzburg, Bavaria. In pre-World War II football, the club competed briefly at the highest level in the Bezirksliga Bayern, and during the war, in the Gauliga Bayern. Post-war, it made a single appearance in professional football in the southern division of the 2. Bundesliga in 1977–78. After a long stint in amateur football, dropping as low as the seventh tier, the club began a recovery. The Kickers reached professional football again in 2014–15 after winning promotion to the 3. Liga and the following season were promoted to the 2. Bundesliga.

== History ==
=== Foundation and early years ===
FC Würzburger Kickers was founded on 17 November 1907 by local high school students under chairman Georg Beer, soon replaced by Alfred Günzburger. The club gained promotion to the Kreisliga Bayern in 1912 and establish themselves in the league.

Founded in 1907 by high school students, the team has played for most of its history as an unknown local side, although they did manage three seasons in the Bezirksliga Bayern, from 1930 to 1933, and two single season appearances in the Gauliga Bayern (1940–41, 1942–43) one of sixteen top-flight division established in the re-organization of German football under the Third Reich.

=== 1920s to the Second World War ===
Until the Second World War, Kickers continued to be the determining force in Würzburg football, with FV 04 Würzburg only being able to catch up in the late 1920s.

The club was relegated in the 1922/23 season and subsequently missed out on joining the newly formed Bezirksliga Bayern the next season. Kickers were eventually promoted back to the top division for the 1930/31 season, joining rivals FV 04, where they remained until the league was dissolved in 1933.

Kickers were not selected to join the new Gauliga Bayern and did not reach the top division again until 1940/41 where they were subsequently relegated. Towards the end of World War II, Kickers were forced into a merger with FV 04 to play together as the wartime side (Kriegspielgemeinschaft) KSG Würzburg. The unified club spent two seasons in last place in the Gauliga Bayern (Gruppe Nord). Play was interrupted as the war progressed and the team was disbanded at the end of the conflict.

Kicker's stadium at Randerackerer Straße was also completely destroyed by a bombing raid during the war.

=== Post-war football and rise to the 2. Bundesliga Süd ===
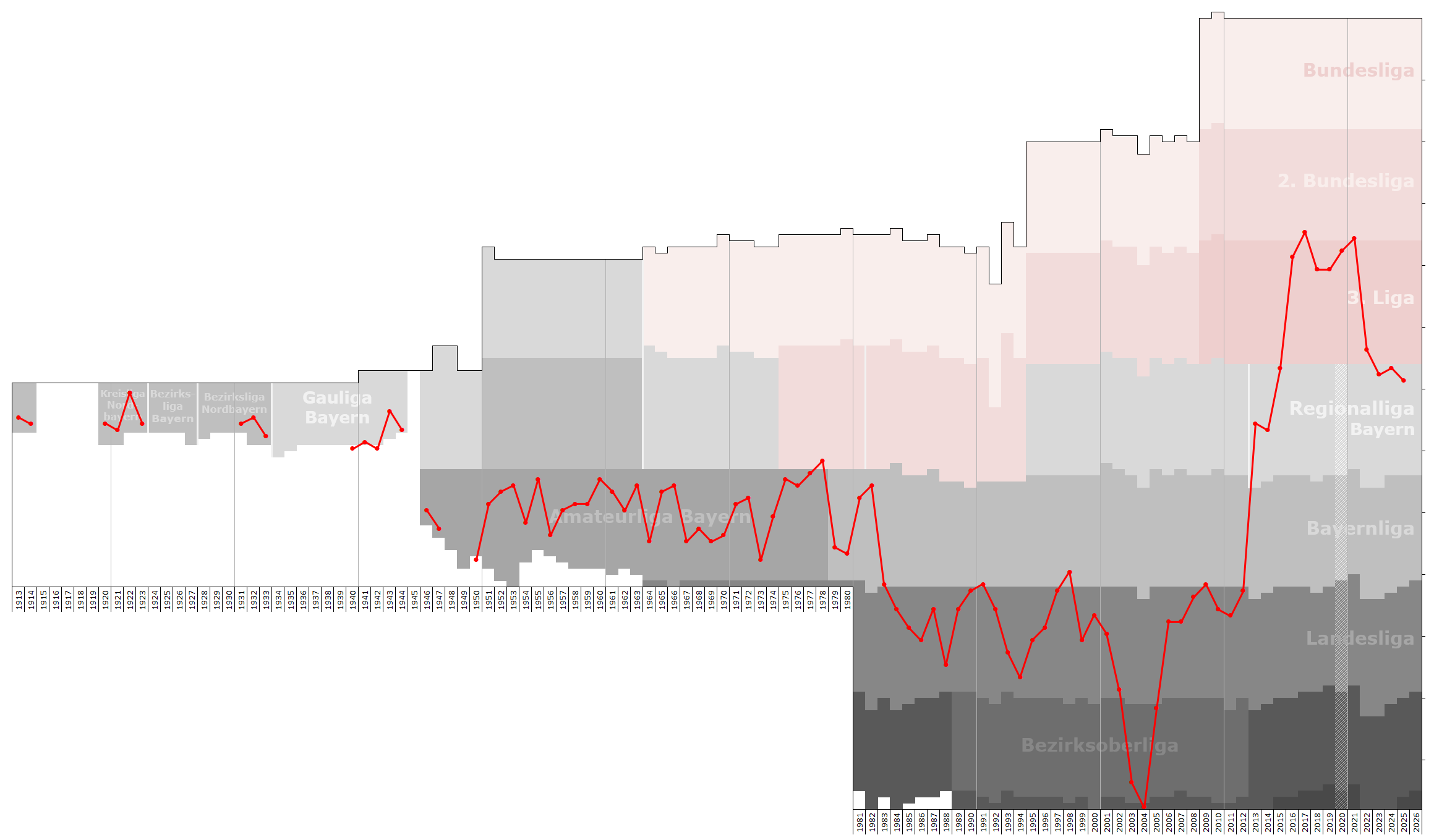
Historical chart of Würzburger Kickers league performance

After the Second World War, TSV Würzburg joined the Kickers and the club was renamed SV Würzburger Kickers. The club became part of the Landesliga Bayern (II) and put on some strong performances through the 1950s in the Amateurliga Bayern (II-III) but never quite managed a breakthrough. During this time the club moved to the newly built Stadion am Dallenberg in 1967. The club was finally promoted in 1976/77 to the 2. Bundesliga Süd, however they were relegated back to the renamed Bayernliga the following 1977/78 season.

=== 1980s to 2012 ===
Kickers stayed in the Bayernliga until they were relegated in 1983 due to financial difficulties contributed to the fourth division Landesliga Bayern-Nord, which became a fifth tier league in 1994. The club remained in the lower tiers of amateur football with the exception of brief appearances in the Bayernliga in 1990/91 and 1997/98.

Two difficult seasons over 2002–2004 saw the club descend through the Bezirksoberliga Unterfranken (VI) to the Bezirksliga Unterfranken (VII). Kickers recovered and returned to the Oberliga Bayern on the strength of a 2nd place in the 2007–08 Landesliga season where the club met local rival Würzburger FV there for the first Würzburg league derby since 1998–99.

The 2008–09 season proved no success, with Kickers immediately relegated again to the Landesliga, taking until 2012 to win the league again. The team was one of two clubs in the league to apply for a licence in the new tier four Regionalliga Bayern Taking part in the promotion play-off, Kickers earned a bye in the first round and defeated BC Aichach in the second to play in the Regionalliga from 2012. The club was thereby also able to win promotion from the sixth tier to the fourth without playing in the fifth.

=== Promotions and successes ===
Since promotion in 2012 Kickers have enjoyed a period of renewed success including winning the 2013–14 Bavarian Cup on penalties in the final against SV Schalding-Heining and thereby qualified for the first round of the 2014–15 DFB-Pokal. In the league, the club finished tenth in 2013 and eleventh in 2014. In the 2014–15 DFB Pokal, Kickers knocked-out Fortuna Düsseldorf in the first round but was defeated by Eintracht Braunschweig in the second round. In the 2014–15 season, Kickers won the Regionalliga Bayern and earned the right to take part in the promotion round to the 3. Liga. They faced 1. FC Saarbrücken, runners-up of the Regionalliga Südwest, and won 1–0 away but also lost 1–0 at home. In the necessary penalty shoot-out, Kickers won 6–5 and were promoted to the 3. Liga.

In March 2016, the club's fans protested against a potential merger with local rival Würzburger FV. Kickers had been asked by the Mayor of Würzburg to hold talks about mergers and cooperation with a number of local clubs in order to receive the city's support in a stadium expansion. Kickers finished the inaugural 3. Liga season in third place, thereby qualifying for the promotion play-off and the 2016–17 DFB-Pokal. The club ensured promotion to the 2. Bundesliga for the first time in almost 40 years by winning 4–1 (2–0/2–1) on aggregate against MSV Duisburg. Despite a strong start to the season, finishing the first half in sixth place, Kickers were relegated in seventeenth place back to the 3. Liga at the end of the season.

The club won the 2018–19 Bavarian Cup following a 3–0 victory in the final over neighbours and rivals Viktoria Aschaffenburg.

In January 2020, it was announced that Felix Magath would serve as sporting director of Flyeralarm Global Soccer group, including Admira Wacker Mödling and Würzburger Kickers.

Kickers returned to the 2. Bundesliga after the 2019–20 season, finishing runners-up behind Bayern Munich II who were ineligible for promotion.

=== Return to Regionalliga ===
After promotion to the 2. Bundesliga in 2020, Würzburger Kickers were on a downward trajectory. They suffered relegation after one season in the 3. Liga in 2021, before being relegated again in the 2021–22 season – their second successive relegation – marking a return to the fourth-tier Regionalliga.

== Honours ==
=== League ===
- 3. Liga (III)
  - Runners-up: 2019–20
  - Third: 2015–16 (Promoted after play-off)
- Bayernliga (III)
  - Champions: 1977
- Bayernliga-Nord (III)
  - Runners-up: 1955, 1960
- Regionalliga Bayern (IV)
  - Champions: 2014–15
- Landesliga Bayern-Nord (IV–V)
  - Champions: 1990, 1997, 2012
  - Runners-up: 2008
- Bezirksoberliga Unterfranken (VI)
  - Champions: 2005
- Bezirksliga Unterfranken (VII)
  - Champions: 2004

=== Cup ===
- Bavarian Cup
  - Winners: 2014, 2016, 2019, 2026

== Players ==
=== Current squad ===
As of 4 September 2026

Note: Flags indicate national team as defined under FIFA eligibility rules; some limited exceptions apply. Players may hold more than one non-FIFA nationality.

No.	Pos.	Nation	Player
1	GK	GER	Johann Hipper
3	DF	GER	David Abrangao (on loan from Greuther Fürth)
4	DF	BEL	Nathan de Medina
5	DF	GER	Leo Eberle
6	MF	ERI	Namrud Embaye
7	FW	ANG	Eliot Muteba
8	MF	GER	David Kinsombi
9	FW	GER	Jermain Nischalke
10	MF	KOS	Eroll Zejnullahu
11	FW	KOS	Dion Berisha
13	MF	GER	Philipp Ochs
14	MF	CRO	Noah Mikrut
15	FW	GER	Tiago De Moura
16	DF	GER	Louis Breunig (on loan from Eintracht Braunschweig)
17	DF	BEN	Liam Omore

No.	Pos.	Nation	Player
18	FW	CMR	Franck Evina
19	FW	GER	Thomas Kastanaras
20	MF	GER	Dorian Deppner
21	DF	GER	Luke Hemmerich
22	DF	GER	Daniel Hägele (captain)
25	MF	GER	Dominik Meisel
27	MF	GER	Xaver Kiefersauer (on loan from 1. FC Nürnberg)
28	DF	GER	Ebrahim Farahnak
30	FW	GER	Tarsis Bonga
31	MF	GER	Tim Kraus
33	GK	SUI	Marko Rajkovačić
34	DF	GER	Burak Karakaya
36	MF	GER	Batuhan Gögce
37	MF	GER	Ivan Franjić

=== Out on loan ===
Note: Flags indicate national team as defined under FIFA eligibility rules; some limited exceptions apply. Players may hold more than one non-FIFA nationality.

No. / Pos. / Nation / Player; — / DF / MAR / Nassim El Ouarti (at 1. FC Kaiserslautern II until 30 June 2027)	No. / Pos. / Nation / Player; — / DF / MKD / Kristijan Taseski (at FC 08 Homburg until 30 June 2027)

== Recent managers ==
Recent managers of the club:

Manager	Start	Finish
Predrag Uzelac	1 April 2009	1 October 2009
Dieter Wirsching	1 October 2009	30 June 2010
Anton Kramer	1 July 2010	2 March 2011
Dieter Wirsching	3 March 2011	30 June 2014
Bernd Hollerbach	1 July 2014	30 June 2017
Stephan Schmidt	1 July 2017	2 October 2017
Michael Schiele	2 October 2017	29 September 2020
Marco Antwerpen	30 September 2020	8 November 2020
Bernhard Trares	9 November 2020	2 April 2021
Ralf Santelli; Sebastian Schuppan	2 April 2021	30 June 2021
Torsten Ziegner	1 July 2021	4 October 2021
Danny Schwarz	13 October 2021	10 February 2022
Ralf Santelli	10 February 2022	30 June 2022
Marco Wildersinn	1 July 2022	30 June 2024
Markus Zschiesche	1 July 2024	9 September 2024
Martin Lanig	22 September 2024	24 April 2025
Sebastian Neumann	24 April 2025	30 June 2025
Marc Reitmaier	1 July 2025	16 March 2026
Michael Schiele	16 March 2026	Present

== Recent seasons ==
The recent season-by-season performance of the club:

Season	Division	Tier	Position
1963–64	Bayernliga	III	12th
1964–65	Bayernliga	III	4th
1965–66	Bayernliga	III	3rd
1966–67	Bayernliga	III	12th
1967–68	Bayernliga	III	10th
1968–69	Bayernliga	III	12th
1969–70	Bayernliga	III	11th
1970–71	Bayernliga	III	6th
1971–72	Bayernliga	III	5th
1972–73	Bayernliga	III	15th
1973–74	Bayernliga	III	8th
1974–75	Bayernliga	III	6th
1975–76	Bayernliga	III	3rd
1976–77	Bayernliga	III	1st ↑
1977–78	2. Bundesliga Süd	II	19th ↓
1978–79	Bayernliga	III	13th
1979–80	Bayernliga	III	14th
1980–81	Bayernliga	III	5th
1981–82	Bayernliga	III	3rd
1982–83	Bayernliga	III	19th ↓
1983–84	Landesliga Bayern-Nord	IV	4th
1984–85	Landesliga Bayern-Nord	IV	7th
1985–86	Landesliga Bayern-Nord	IV	9th
1986–87	Landesliga Bayern-Nord	IV	4th
1987–88	Landesliga Bayern-Nord	IV	13th
1988–89	Landesliga Bayern-Nord	IV	4th
1989–90	Landesliga Bayern-Nord	IV	1st ↑
1990–91	Bayernliga	III	17th ↓
1991–92	Landesliga Bayern-Nord	IV	4th
1992–93	Landesliga Bayern-Nord	IV	11th
1993–94	Landesliga Bayern-Nord	IV	15th
1994–95	Landesliga Bayern-Nord	V	9th
1995–96	Landesliga Bayern-Nord	V	7th
1996–97	Landesliga Bayern-Nord	V	1st ↑
1997–98	Bayernliga	IV	16th ↓
1998–99	Landesliga Bayern-Nord	V	9th
1999–2000	Landesliga Bayern-Nord	V	5th
2000–01	Landesliga Bayern-Nord	V	8th
2001–02	Landesliga Bayern-Nord	V	17th ↓
2002–03	Bezirksoberliga Unterfranken	VI	13th ↓
2003–04	Bezirksliga Unterfranken	VII	1st ↑
2004–05	Bezirksoberliga Unterfranken	VI	1st ↑
2005–06	Landesliga Bayern-Nord	V	6th
2006–07	Landesliga Bayern-Nord	V	6th
2007–08	Landesliga Bayern-Nord	V	2nd ↑
2008–09	Bayernliga	V	18th ↓
2009–10	Landesliga Bayern-Nord	VI	5th
2010–11	Landesliga Bayern-Nord	VI	5th
2011–12	Landesliga Bayern-Nord	VI	1st ↑
2012–13	Regionalliga Bayern	IV	10th
2013–14	Regionalliga Bayern	IV	11th
2014–15	Regionalliga Bayern	IV	1st ↑
2015–16	3. Liga	III	3rd ↑
2016–17	2. Bundesliga	II	17th ↓
2017–18	3. Liga	III	5th
2018–19	3. Liga	III	5th
2019–20	3. Liga	III	2nd ↑
2020–21	2. Bundesliga	II	18th ↓
2021–22	3. Liga	III	18th ↓
2022–23	Regionalliga Bayern	IV	2nd
2023–24	Regionalliga Bayern	IV	1st
2024–25	Regionalliga Bayern	IV	6th
2025–26	Regionalliga Bayern	IV	2nd ↑

- With the introduction of the Bezirksoberligas in 1988 as the new fifth tier, below the Landesligas, all leagues below dropped one tier. With the introduction of the Regionalligas in 1994 and the 3. Liga in 2008 as the new third tier, below the 2. Bundesliga, all leagues below dropped one tier. With the establishment of the Regionalliga Bayern as the new fourth tier in Bavaria in 2012 the Bayernliga was split into a northern and a southern division, the number of Landesligas expanded from three to five and the Bezirksoberligas abolished. All leagues from the Bezirksligas onwards were elevated one tier.

Key

↑ Promoted	↓ Relegated

== Stadium ==
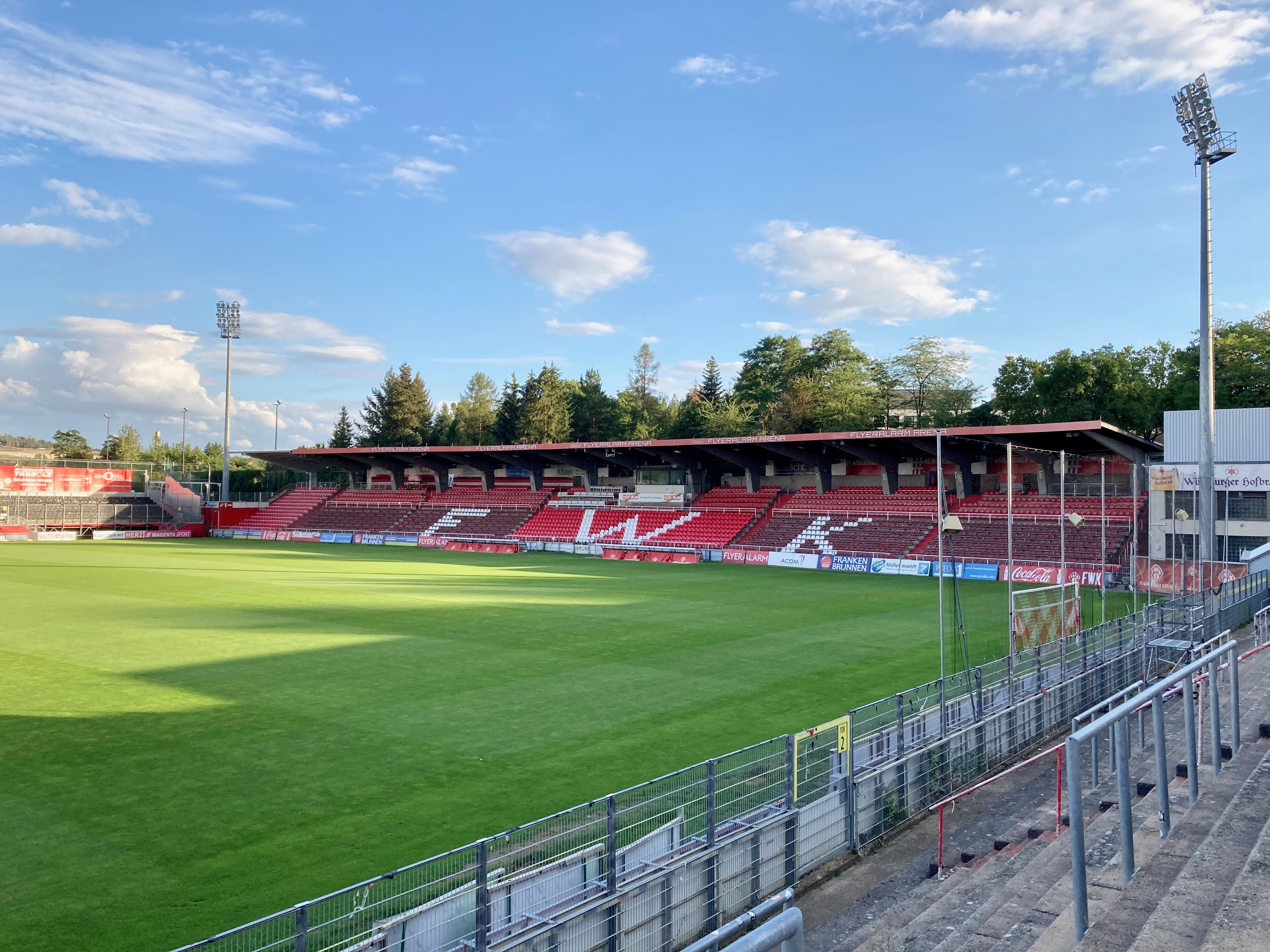
Flyeralarm Arena (2020)

Kickers have played in three different home grounds through their history beginning with Galgenberg, also known as Kugelfang, for two years sharing the ground with local rivals Würzburger FV (formally known as FV 04 Würzburg).

From 1909 to 1967 the club played in Sanderau at the Randersacker Straße stadium before being forced to move due to the expanding city.

Since 1967 the club have played at the Stadion am Dallenberg which currently has a capacity of 13,090 (4,000 seated). In 2013 flyeralarm acquired the naming rights to the stadium which has since been known as flyeralarm Arena. The facility was renovated in 2005 and equipped with floodlights in 2014. In preparation for the 2016/17 season in the 2. Bundesliga the stadium was expanded and under soil heating was added at a cost of €2 million.

== Supporters and rivalries ==
The Würzburg derby is a fierce local rivalry with Würzburger FV, and the fans have a hostility with fans of 1. FC Schweinfurt 05.

== Reserve team ==
The club's reserve team won promotion to the tier five Bayernliga for the first time after defeating VfL Frohnlach in the play-off for the 2016–17 Bayernliga.

== The Würzburg derby ==
The Würzburg derby between Würzburger Kickers and FV Würzburg 04 was first played in 1908 with Kickers winning 5–0. The 2009–10 season was the 19th time, the two clubs played in the same league since 1963, during which time FV folded in 1981 before being reformed. The derby has only beenplayed on professional level only once, in the 1977–78 2. Bundesliga Süd season.

=== Results since 1963 ===
Season	League	Teams	Home	Away
1964–65	Amateurliga Bayern	Würzburger FV – Würzburger Kickers	2–1	1–5
1965–66	Amateurliga Bayern	Würzburger FV – Würzburger Kickers	0–1	1–1
1970–71	Amateurliga Bayern	Würzburger FV – Würzburger Kickers	3–1	2–1
1971–72	Amateurliga Bayern	Würzburger FV – Würzburger Kickers	1–3	4–1
1972–73	Amateurliga Bayern	Würzburger FV – Würzburger Kickers	1–0	3–1
1973–74	Amateurliga Bayern	Würzburger FV – Würzburger Kickers	2–1	0–0
1974–75	Amateurliga Bayern	Würzburger FV – Würzburger Kickers	3–0	1–0
1975–76	Amateurliga Bayern	Würzburger FV – Würzburger Kickers	3–0	1–1
1977–78	2. Bundesliga Süd	Würzburger FV – Würzburger Kickers	4–0	2–2
1980–81	Amateur Oberliga Bayern	Würzburger FV – Würzburger Kickers	0–0	1–1
1991–92	Landesliga Bayern-Nord	Würzburger FV – Würzburger Kickers	1–2	1–3
1992–93	Landesliga Bayern-Nord	Würzburger FV – Würzburger Kickers	5–1	3–0
1993–94	Landesliga Bayern-Nord	Würzburger FV – Würzburger Kickers	3–3	0–5
1994–95	Landesliga Bayern-Nord	Würzburger FV – Würzburger Kickers	4–1	1–5
1996–96	Landesliga Bayern-Nord	Würzburger FV – Würzburger Kickers	3–0	1–1
1996–97	Landesliga Bayern-Nord	Würzburger FV – Würzburger Kickers	3–2	0–0
1998–99	Landesliga Bayern-Nord	Würzburger FV – Würzburger Kickers	4–0	0–1
2008–09	Bayernliga	Würzburger FV – Würzburger Kickers	1–2	2–5
2009–10	Landesliga Bayern-Nord	Würzburger FV – Würzburger Kickers	4–1	0–2
2012–13	Bavarian Cup	Würzburger FV – Würzburger Kickers	5–4 (pen)	
2018–19	Bavarian Cup	Würzburger FV – Würzburger Kickers	0–4	

== DFB Cup appearances ==
The club has qualified for the first round of the German Cup ten times:

Season	Round	Date	Home	Away	Result	Attendance
1978–79	First round	4 August 1978	SC Herford	Würzburger Kickers	2–1	
1980–81	First round	30 August 1980	Würzburger Kickers	TSV Hirschaid	2–1 (a.e.t)	
1980–81	Second round	4 October 1980	Würzburger Kickers	Fortuna Düsseldorf	0–2	
1981–82	First round	28 August 1981	SV Neckargerach	Würzburger Kickers	4–2	
2014–15	First round	17 August 2014	Würzburger Kickers	Fortuna Düsseldorf	3–2 (a.e.t)	10,500
2014–15	Second round	28 October 2014	Würzburger Kickers	Eintracht Braunschweig	0–1	12,000
2015–16	First round	8 August 2015	Würzburger Kickers	SV Werder Bremen	0–2 (a.e.t)	9,706
2016–17	First round	20 August 2016	Würzburger Kickers	Eintracht Braunschweig	1–0 (a.e.t)	6,384
2016–17	Second round	25 October 2016	Würzburger Kickers	TSV 1860 Munich	3–4	12,142
2017–18	First round	12 August 2017	Würzburger Kickers	SV Werder Bremen	0–3	8,090
2019–20	First round	10 August 2019	Würzburger Kickers	TSG 1899 Hoffenheim	4–5 (p)	10,000
2020–21	First round	14 September 2020	Würzburger Kickers	Hannover 96	2–3	0
2021–22	First round	8 August 2021	Würzburger Kickers	SC Freiburg	0–1	2,820

Source:"DFB-Pokal" (in German). Weltfussball.de.
