= 2021–22 1. FC Schweinfurt 05 season =

1. FC Schweinfurt 05
2021–22 season
- President: Markus Wolf
- Head coach: Tobias Strobl
- Stadium: Sachs-Stadion
- Regionalliga Bayern: 3rd
- Bavarian Cup: Quarter-finals
- Top goalscorer: League: Adam Jabiri (20); All: Adam Jabiri (21)
- Biggest win: Tiefenbach 0–10 Schweinfurt
- Biggest defeat: Burghausen 5–2 Schweinfurt; Schweinfurt 3–6 Bayern II
| Home colours | Away colours | Third colours |
- All statistics correct as of 28 January 2022.

The 2021–22 1. FC Schweinfurt 05 season is the 116th season in the history of the association football club based in Schweinfurt, Germany. In addition to the domestic league, Schweinfurt also participates in this season's edition of the Bavarian Cup. This is the 85th season for Schweinfurt in the Sachs-Stadion. The season covers a period from 1 July 2021 to 30 June 2022.

== Players ==
=== Squad ===
As of 10 February 2022|

Note: Flags indicate national team as defined under FIFA eligibility rules; some limited exceptions apply. Players may hold more than one non-FIFA nationality.

| No. | Pos. | Nation | Player |
|---|---|---|---|
| 1 | GK | GER | Luis Zwick (captain) |
| 3 | DF | GER | Thomas Haas |
| 7 | MF | GER | Amar Cekic |
| 8 | MF | USA | Malik McLemore |
| 9 | FW | MNE | Meris Skenderović |
| 10 | FW | GER | Florian Pieper |
| 11 | FW | BIH | Amar Suljic |
| 12 | GK | GER | Andreas Binner |
| 13 | MF | GER | Kristian Böhnlein |
| 14 | MF | GER | Martin Thomann |
| 15 | MF | GER | Kevin Fery |
| 16 | MF | GER | Marco Zietsch |
| 17 | DF | GER | Nico Rinderknecht |

| No. | Pos. | Nation | Player |
|---|---|---|---|
| 18 | DF | GER | Jannik Schuster |
| 19 | DF | GER | Nicolas Pfarr |
| 20 | FW | KOS | Edin Hyseni |
| 21 | DF | GER | David Grözinger |
| 23 | DF | GER | Vitus Scheithauer |
| 24 | GK | GER | Nico Stephan |
| 25 | GK | GER | Bennet Schmid |
| 27 | FW | GER | Adam Jabiri |
| 31 | MF | GER | Tim Kraus |
| 32 | DF | GER | Lukas Billick (vice-captain) |
| 37 | MF | GER | Daniel Adlung |
| — | FW | GER | Emir Bas |

=== Out on loan ===
Note: Flags indicate national team as defined under FIFA eligibility rules; some limited exceptions apply. Players may hold more than one non-FIFA nationality.

| No. | Pos. | Nation | Player |
|---|---|---|---|
| — | FW | GER | Emir Bas (at Würzburger FV until 31 December 2021) |

== Transfers ==
=== In ===
| No. | Pos | Player | Transferred from | Fee | Date | Source |
|---|---|---|---|---|---|---|
| 37 | MF | (Germany) Daniel Adlung | (Germany) Greuther Fürth II | Free transfer | 1 July 2021 | |
| 18 | DF | (Germany) Jannik Schuster | (Germany) FC Augsburg II | Free transfer | 1 July 2021 | |
| 16 | MF | (Germany) Tim Kraus | (Germany) FC Ingolstadt II | Free transfer | 1 July 2021 | |
| 24 | GK | (Germany) Nico Stephan | (Germany) 1. FC Geesdorf | Free transfer | 1 July 2021 | |
| 25 | GK | (Germany) Bennet Schmid | (Germany) SC Freiburg II | Free transfer | 1 July 2021 | |
| 16 | MF | (Germany) Marco Zietsch | (Germany) 1. FC Nürnberg II | Free transfer | 1 July 2021 | |
| 9 | FW | (Montenegro) Meris Skenderović | (Germany) TSG Hoffenheim II | Free transfer | 5 July 2021 | |
| 8 | MF | (United States) Malik McLemore | (Germany) Union Fürstenwalde | Free transfer | 27 July 2021 | |

=== Out ===
| No. | Pos | Player | Transferred to | Fee | Date | Source |
|---|---|---|---|---|---|---|
| | MF | (Germany) Benedict Laverty | (Germany) Viktoria Aschaffenburg | Free transfer | 1 July 2021 | |
| | GK | (Germany) Jan Reichert | (Germany) 1. FC Nürnberg II | Free transfer | 1 July 2021 | |
| | FW | (Romania) Sascha Marinkovic | (Germany) TSV 1860 Rosenheim | Free transfer | 1 July 2021 | |
| | MF | (Germany) Lukas Ramser | (Germany) TSG Balingen | Free transfer | 1 July 2021 | |
| | MF | (Germany) Philipp Maier | (Germany) SSV Ulm 1846 | Free transfer | 1 July 2021 | |
| | MF | (Germany) Aaron Frimpong Manu | (Germany) Rot-Weiß Erfurt | Free transfer | 1 July 2021 | |
| | DF | (Germany) Maximilian Bauer | | Retired | 1 July 2021 | |
| | DF | (Germany) Lamar Yarbrough | (Germany) SG Sonnenhof Großaspach | Free transfer | 24 January 2022 | |

== Competitions ==
=== Regionalliga Bayern ===
==== Results by round ====
| Round | 1 | 2 | 3 | 4 | 5 | 6 | 7 | 8 | 9 | 10 | 11 | 12 | 13 | 14 | 15 | 16 | 17 | 18 | 19 |
|---|---|---|---|---|---|---|---|---|---|---|---|---|---|---|---|---|---|---|---|
| Ground | A | H | A | H | A | H | A | H | A | H | A | H | A | H | A | H | A | A | H |
| Result | D | W | W | W | L | D | D | W | W | W | L | L | D | W | | W | W | D | W |
| Position | 9 | 3 | 3 | 2 | 4 | 5 | 6 | 5 | 3 | 3 | 4 | | 4 | | | | | | |

Updated to match(es) played on October 2021. Source: BFV
A = Away; H = Home; W = Win; D = Draw; L = Loss

==== Matches ====
League fixtures as announced by BFV:

Win Draw Loss Fixtures

| 17 July 2021 1 | TSV Buchbach | 1–1 | 1. FC Schweinfurt 05 | Buchbach |
| 17:00 CEST (UTC+02:00) | Matera 63' | Report | Adlung 8' | Stadium: SMR-Arena; Attendance: 711; Referee: Markus Pflaum |

| 24 July 2021 2 | 1. FC Schweinfurt 05 | 5–1 | TSV Rain | Schweinfurt |
| 14:00 CEST (UTC+02:00) | Fery 3' Haas 8' Jabiri 15', 22' Böhnlein 80' (pen.) | Report | Abou-Kkalil 9' | Stadium: Sachs-Stadion; Attendance: 648; Referee: Tobias Wittmann |

| 27 July 2021 3 | SpVgg Greuther Fürth II | 1–4 | 1. FC Schweinfurt 05 | Fürth |
| 18:30 CEST (UTC+02:00) | Pisanu 6' | Report | Suljic 24', 37' Pieper 72' Adlung 76' | Stadium: Sportpark Ronhof; Attendance: 581; Referee: Simon Schreiner |

| 31 July 2021 4 | 1. FC Schweinfurt 05 | 5–1 | TSV Aubstadt | Schweinfurt |
| 14:00 CEST (UTC+02:00) | Böhnlein 1' Skenderović 12', 37', 55' Jabiri 43' | Report | Dellinger 44' | Stadium: Sachs-Stadion; Attendance: 1.500; Referee: Jürgen Steckermeier |

| 3 August 2021 5 | Wacker Burghausen | 5–2 | 1. FC Schweinfurt 05 | Burghausen |
| 19:00 CEST (UTC+02:00) | Maier 18' Schulz 21' Ungerath 31', 43' Moser 68' | Report | Cekic 17' Jabiri 45+2' | Stadium: Wacker-Arena; Attendance: 980; Referee: Michael Bacher |

| 7 August 2021 6 | 1. FC Schweinfurt 05 | 1–1 | 1. FC Nürnberg II | Schweinfurt |
| 14:00 CEST (UTC+02:00) | Jabiri 56' | Report | Sausen 74' | Stadium: Sachs-Stadion; Attendance: 927; Referee: Johannes Hamper |

| 13 August 2021 7 | FC Augsburg II | 2–2 | 1. FC Schweinfurt 05 | Augsburg |
| 19:00 CEST (UTC+02:00) | Koudossou 35' Lobenhofer 80' | Report | Jabiri 32' Skenderović 68' | Stadium: Rosenaustadion; Attendance: 750; Referee: Assad Nouhoum |

| 17 August 2021 8 | 1. FC Schweinfurt 05 | 4–0 | SV Heimstetten | Schweinfurt |
| 19:00 CEST (UTC+02:00) | Pieper 6', 39' Adlung 22' Skenderović 90+1' | Report | | Stadium: Sachs-Stadion; Attendance: 560; Referee: André Denzlein |

| 20 August 2021 9 | SC Eltersdorf | 0–4 | 1. FC Schweinfurt 05 | Erlangen |
| 19:00 CEST (UTC+02:00) | | Report | Jabiri 7', 28', 60' Skenderović 41' | Stadium: ELSNER Sportpark; Attendance: 500; Referee: Roman Potemkin |

| 28 August 2021 10 | 1. FC Schweinfurt 05 | 6–0 | VfB Eichstätt | Schweinfurt |
| 14:00 CEST (UTC+02:00) | Jabiri 15', 38' Skenderović 25', 30' Cekic 62' Pieper 80' | Report | | Stadium: Sachs-Stadion; Attendance: 670; Referee: Julian Kreye |

| 31 August 2021 11 | FC Memmingen | 1–0 | 1. FC Schweinfurt 05 | Memmingen |
| 19:30 CEST (UTC+02:00) | Scholz 54' | Report | | Stadium: Arena Memmingen; Attendance: Stefan Treiber; Referee: 624 |

| 28 September 2021 12 | 1. FC Schweinfurt 05 | 3–6 | FC Bayern München II | Schweinfurt |
| 19:00 CEST (UTC+02:00) | Böhnlein 42' Suljic 76' Jabiri 90' | Report | Motika 18', 58', 60', 86' Tillman 39' Aydin 90+2' | Stadium: Sachs-Stadion; Attendance: 3340; Referee: Patrick Hanslbauer |

| 10 September 2021 13 | FC Pipinsried | 2–2 | 1. FC Schweinfurt 05 | Altomünster |
| 17:15 CEST (UTC+02:00) | Schraufstetter 23', 87' | Report | Grözinger 3' Skenderović 48' | Stadium: Hauptplatz FC Pipinsried; Attendance: Thomas Berg; Referee: 521 |

| 18 September 2021 14 | 1. FC Schweinfurt 05 | 6–0 | SV Schalding-Heining | Schweinfurt |
| 14:00 CEST (UTC+02:00) | Rinderknecht 28' Jabiri 31', 51', 68' Skenderović 77', 90' | Report | | Stadium: Sachs-Stadion; Attendance: 602; Referee: Elias Tiedeken |

| 2 November 2021 15 | SpVgg Unterhaching | v | 1. FC Schweinfurt 05 | Unterhaching |
| 19:00 CET (UTC+01:00) | | Report | | Stadium: Alpenbauer Sportpark |

| 2 October 2021 16 | 1. FC Schweinfurt 05 | 8–0 | TSV 1860 Rosenheim | Schweinfurt |
| 14:00 CEST (UTC+02:00) | Skenderović 37' Jabiri 42' Adlung 45', 81' Böhnlein 47' Cekic 49' Suljic 73', 77' | Report | | Stadium: Sachs-Stadion; Attendance: 452; Referee: Christopher Schwarzmann |

| 9 October 2021 17 | SpVgg Bayreuth | 0–3 | 1. FC Schweinfurt 05 | Bayreuth |
| 14:00 CEST (UTC+02:00) | | Report | Fery 11' Adlung 68' Suljic 84' | Stadium: Hans-Walter-Wild-Stadion; Attendance: 1785; Referee: Benjamin Cortus |

| 16 October 2021 18 | FV Illertissen | 1–1 | 1. FC Schweinfurt 05 | Illertissen |
| 14:00 CEST (UTC+02:00) | Telalovic 1' | Report | Fery 21' | Stadium: Vöhlinstadion; Attendance: 420; Referee: Markus Pflaum |

| 23 October 2021 19 | 1. FC Schweinfurt 05 | 2–1 | SV Viktoria Aschaffenburg | Schweinfurt |
| 14:00 CEST (UTC+02:00) | Cekic 37' Jabiri 90' | Report | Desch 7' | Stadium: Sachs-Stadion; Attendance: 580; Referee: Andreas Hummel |

=== Bavarian Cup ===
Bavarian Cup fixtures as announced by BFV:

Win Draw Loss Fixtures

| 10 August 2021 First round | FC Tiefenbach DJK | 0–10 | 1. FC Schweinfurt 05 | Tiefenbach |
| 18:00 CEST (UTC+2) | | Report | McLemore 14', 24', 46' Pieper 18' (pen.), 42', 47', 81' Suljic 35' Pfarr 60' Skenderović 86' | Stadium: Sportanlage Tiefenbach; Attendance: 316; Referee: Michael Freund |

| 24 August 2021 Second round | SV Friesen | 0–3 | 1. FC Schweinfurt 05 | Kronach |
| 17:45 CEST (UTC+2) | | Report | Böhnlein 76' Pieper 78' Fery 87' | Stadium: Sportanlage Friesen; Attendance: 470; Referee: Benjamin Mignon |

| 7 September 2021 Round of 16 | SV Alemannia Haibach | 1–10 | 1. FC Schweinfurt 05 | Haibach |
| 17:30 CEST (UTC+2) | Gelzleichter 21' | Report | Skenderović 19' Pieper 23' Böhnlein 32', 84' Cekic 45', 50' Jabiri 47' (pen.) Huseini 69' Adlung 77' Schuster 80' | Stadium: Sportgelände am Hohen Kreuz; Attendance: 330; Referee: Manuel Steigerwald |

| 13 November 2021 Quarter-finals | 1. FC Schweinfurt 05 | v | FC Würzburger Kickers | Schweinfurt |
| 14:00 CET (UTC+1) | | Report | | Stadium: Sachs-Stadion |
