= 2015–16 2. Bundesliga =

42nd season of the second-tier football league in Germany

2. Bundesliga
- Season: 2015–16
- Champions: SC Freiburg
- Promoted: SC Freiburg; RB Leipzig
- Relegated: MSV Duisburg (via play-off); FSV Frankfurt; SC Paderborn
- Matches: 306
- Goals: 808 (2.64 per match)
- Top goalscorer: Simon Terodde (25 goals)
- Biggest home win: Eintracht Braunschweig 6−0; Karlsruher SC
- Biggest away win: SC Paderborn 0−6; SV Sandhausen
- Highest scoring: SC Freiburg 6−3; 1. FC Nürnberg
- Longest winning run: 8 games SC Freiburg
- Longest unbeaten run: 18 games 1. FC Nürnberg
- Longest winless run: 13 games SC Paderborn
- Longest losing run: 6 games FSV Frankfurt
- Highest attendance: 54,100; 1860 Munich v SC Paderborn
- Lowest attendance: 4,084; Frankfurt v Sandhausen
- Average attendance: 19,176

The 2015–16 2. Bundesliga was the 42nd season of the 2. Bundesliga.

== Teams ==
Locations of the 2015–16 2. Bundesliga teams

A total of 18 teams participated in the 2015–16 2. Bundesliga. These include 14 teams from the 2014–15 2. Bundesliga, together with SC Freiburg and SC Paderborn, who directly relegated from the 2014–15 Bundesliga, and Arminia Bielefeld and MSV Duisburg, who directly promoted from the 2014–15 3. Liga. The 16th-placed 2014–15 2. Bundesliga team, 1860 Munich, defeated the third-place finisher in the 2014–15 3. Liga, Holstein Kiel, in a two-legged play-off and avoided relegation.

=== Stadiums and locations ===
Team
Arminia Bielefeld
VfL Bochum
Eintracht Braunschweig
MSV Duisburg
Fortuna Düsseldorf
FSV Frankfurt
SpVgg Greuther Fürth
SC Freiburg
1. FC Heidenheim
1. FC Kaiserslautern
Karlsruher SC
RB Leipzig
1860 Munich
1. FC Nürnberg
SC Paderborn 07
SV Sandhausen
FC St. Pauli
1. FC Union Berlin

Notes

1. The capacity is reduced to 42,959 spectators during the 2015-16 season, due to a redevelopment of various stadium areas. The redevelopment includes an expansion of the VIP area, the press box and the wheelchair spaces.

=== Personnel and kits ===
Team	Manager	Captain	Kit manufacturer	Shirt sponsor
Arminia Bielefeld	(Germany) Norbert Meier	(Germany) Fabian Klos	Saller	Alpecin
VfL Bochum	(Netherlands) Gertjan Verbeek	(Germany) Patrick Fabian	Nike	Booster Energy Drink (H) / Netto (A)
MSV Duisburg	(Bulgaria) Iliya Gruev	(Bosnia and Herzegovina) Branimir Bajić	Uhlsport	Black Crevice
Eintracht Braunschweig	(Germany) Torsten Lieberknecht	(Portugal) Marcel Correia	Nike	SEAT
Fortuna Düsseldorf	(Germany) Friedhelm Funkel	(Poland) Adam Bodzek	Puma	o.tel.o
SC Freiburg	(Germany) Christian Streich	(Bosnia and Herzegovina) Mensur Mujdža	Nike	Ehrmann
FSV Frankfurt	(Germany) Falko Götz	(Germany) Manuel Konrad	Saller	Ayondo
SpVgg Greuther Fürth	(Germany) Stefan Ruthenbeck	(Germany) Marco Caligiuri	Hummel	Ergo Direkt Versicherungen
1. FC Heidenheim	(Germany) Frank Schmidt	(Germany) Marc Schnatterer	Nike	Hartmann Gruppe
1. FC Kaiserslautern	(Germany) Konrad Fünfstück	(Germany) Chris Löwe	Uhlsport	Maxda
Karlsruher SC	(Germany) Markus Kauczinski	(Germany) Dirk Orlishausen	Jako	Klaiber Markisen
RB Leipzig	(Germany) Ralf Rangnick	(Germany) Dominik Kaiser	Nike	Red Bull
1860 Munich	(Russia) Denis Bushuev	(Germany) Christopher Schindler	Macron	Think Blue
1. FC Nürnberg	(Switzerland) René Weiler	(Norway) Even Hovland	Adidas	Wolf Möbel
SC Paderborn 07	(Germany) René Müller	(Germany) Uwe Hünemeier	Saller	kfzteile24
SV Sandhausen	(Germany) Alois Schwartz	(Austria) Stefan Kulovits	Puma	Verivox
FC St. Pauli	(Germany) Ewald Lienen	(Germany) Sören Gonther	Hummel	Congstar
1. FC Union Berlin	(Germany) André Hofschneider	(Croatia) Damir Kreilach	Macron	kfzteile24

=== Managerial changes ===
Team	Outgoing manager	Manner of departure	Date of vacancy	Position in table	Incoming manager	Date of appointment
RB Leipzig	(Germany) Achim Beierlorzer	End of caretaker stint	11 May 2015	Preseason	(Germany) Ralf Rangnick	29 May 2015
Greuther Fürth	(Germany) Mike Büskens	Stepped down	28 May 2015	Preseason	(Germany) Stefan Ruthenbeck	12 June 2015
SC Paderborn	(Germany) André Breitenreiter	Left	12 June 2015	Preseason	(Germany) Markus Gellhaus	13 June 2015
Union Berlin	(Germany) Norbert Düwel	Sacked	31 August 2015	14th	(Germany) Sascha Lewandowski	1 September 2015
1. FC Kaiserslautern	(Croatia) Kosta Runjaić	Resigned	23 September 2015	12th	(Germany) Konrad Fünfstück	23 September 2015
1860 Munich	(Germany) Torsten Fröhling	Sacked	6 October 2015	17th	(Germany) Benno Möhlmann	6 October 2015
SC Paderborn	(Germany) Markus Gellhaus	Sacked	6 October 2015	15th	(Germany) Stefan Effenberg	13 October 2015
MSV Duisburg	(Italy) Gino Lettieri	Sacked	2 November 2015	18th	(Bulgaria) Iliya Gruev	3 November 2015
Fortuna Düsseldorf	(Germany) Frank Kramer	Sacked	23 November 2015	17th	(Germany) Peter Hermann (interim)	23 November 2015
Fortuna Düsseldorf	(Germany) Peter Hermann (interim)	Replaced	23 December 2015	15th	(Germany) Marco Kurz	23 December 2015
SC Paderborn	(Germany) Stefan Effenberg	Sacked	3 March 2016	17th	(Germany) René Müller	3 March 2016
Union Berlin	(Germany) Sascha Lewandowski	Stepped down	4 March 2016	11th	(Germany) André Hofschneider	4 March 2016
Fortuna Düsseldorf	(Germany) Marco Kurz	Sacked	13 March 2016	16th	(Germany) Friedhelm Funkel	14 March 2016
FSV Frankfurt	(Germany) Tomas Oral	Sacked	10 April 2016	14th	(Germany) Falko Götz	11 April 2016
1860 Munich	(Germany) Benno Möhlmann	Sacked	19 April 2016	17th	(Germany) Daniel Bierofka	19 April 2016
1860 Munich	(Germany) Daniel Bierofka	Permit expired	9 May 2016	14th	(Russia) Denis Bushuev	19 April 2016

== League table ==
Pos	Team	Pld	W	D	L	GF	GA	GD	Pts	Promotion, qualification or relegation
1	SC Freiburg (C, P)	34	22	6	6	75	39	+36	72	Promotion to Bundesliga
2	RB Leipzig (P)	34	20	7	7	54	32	+22	67	Promotion to Bundesliga
3	1. FC Nürnberg	34	19	8	7	68	41	+27	65	Qualification for promotion play-offs
4	FC St. Pauli	34	15	8	11	45	39	+6	53	
5	VfL Bochum	34	13	12	9	56	40	+16	51	
6	Union Berlin	34	13	10	11	56	50	+6	49	
7	Karlsruher SC	34	12	11	11	35	37	−2	47	
8	Eintracht Braunschweig	34	12	10	12	44	38	+6	46	
9	Greuther Fürth	34	13	7	14	49	55	−6	46	
10	1. FC Kaiserslautern	34	12	9	13	49	47	+2	45	
11	1. FC Heidenheim	34	11	12	11	42	40	+2	45	
12	Arminia Bielefeld	34	8	18	8	38	39	−1	42	
13	SV Sandhausen	34	12	7	15	40	50	−10	40 (Note: SV Sandhausen were deducted three points for license violation.)	
14	Fortuna Düsseldorf	34	9	8	17	32	47	−15	35	
15	1860 Munich	34	8	10	16	32	46	−14	34	
16	MSV Duisburg (R)	34	7	11	16	32	54	−22	32	Qualification for relegation play-offs
17	FSV Frankfurt (R)	34	8	8	18	33	59	−26	32	Relegation to 3. Liga
18	SC Paderborn (R)	34	6	10	18	28	55	−27	28	Relegation to 3. Liga

Source: DFB
Rules for classification: 1) Points; 2) Goal difference; 3) Goals scored
(C) Champions; (P) Promoted; (R) Relegated

== Results ==
Home \ Away	UNB	DSC	BOC	EBS	DUI	F95	FSV	SCF	SGF	FCH	FCK	KSC	RBL	M60	FCN	SCP	SVS	STP
Union Berlin	—	1–1	1–0	3–1	3–2	1–1	4–0	2–1	1–2	1–0	2–2	2–1	1–1	3–0	3–3	0–2	1–0	3–3
Arminia Bielefeld	2–0	—	1–1	0–2	2–1	0–0	0–0	1–4	4–2	0–0	0–1	2–1	0–1	1–1	0–4	1–1	0–0	0–0
VfL Bochum	1–1	2–2	—	2–3	3–0	1–1	4–1	2–0	2–2	1–1	1–2	1–1	0–1	1–0	2–1	4–0	3–2	1–1
Eintracht Braunschweig	2–1	1–0	1–0	—	1–1	0–2	0–0	2–2	0–1	1–0	1–1	6–0	0–2	0–0	3–1	2–1	1–3	0–0
MSV Duisburg	2–1	2–2	0–0	0–5	—	2–1	0–1	1–1	2–2	0–2	1–3	0–1	1–0	2–1	0–0	1–0	3–0	0–2
Fortuna Düsseldorf	0–3	1–0	1–3	1–0	1–1	—	1–0	1–2	1–0	0–1	4–3	0–1	1–3	3–0	1–1	1–2	0–1	1–1
FSV Frankfurt	3–2	1–2	3–2	0–3	3–3	1–2	—	1–3	1–2	0–4	1–4	1–2	0–1	2–1	0–3	0–2	0–1	1–0
SC Freiburg	3–0	2–2	1–3	2–2	3–0	1–2	2–0	—	5–2	2–0	2–0	1–0	2–1	3–0	6–3	4–1	4–1	4–3
Greuther Fürth	2–0	0–0	0–5	3–0	1–1	3–1	0–2	2–3	—	0–2	2–4	1–0	1–2	1–0	3–2	3–0	3–1	0–2
1. FC Heidenheim	0–2	3–2	2–4	2–2	1–0	1–0	2–2	1–2	1–2	—	3–1	1–1	1–1	1–0	0–3	1–1	1–1	2–0
1. FC Kaiserslautern	2–2	0–2	0–2	0–0	2–0	3–0	1–1	0–2	3–1	2–2	—	0–0	1–1	0–1	0–3	1–0	2–0	1–2
Karlsruher SC	0–3	1–1	3–0	2–2	2–0	1–1	1–1	1–1	1–0	0–0	2–0	—	0–1	3–1	2–1	0–0	3–0	1–2
RB Leipzig	3–0	1–1	3–1	2–0	4–2	2–1	3–1	1–1	2–2	3–1	0–2	2–0	—	2–1	3–2	2–0	0–1	0–1
1860 Munich	0–0	1–1	1–1	1–0	1–0	3–2	0–1	0–1	0–1	1–3	1–1	0–1	2–2	—	0–1	1–0	3–2	2–0
1. FC Nürnberg	6–2	2–2	1–1	2–1	1–2	1–0	1–1	2–1	2–1	3–2	2–1	0–0	3–1	2–2	—	2–1	2–0	1–0
SC Paderborn	0–4	1–2	0–1	2–0	0–0	0–0	1–1	1–2	1–1	1–1	0–4	2–0	0–1	4–4	0–1	—	0–6	0–0
SV Sandhausen	4–3	1–4	1–1	0–2	2–2	1–0	1–0	0–2	1–1	0–0	1–0	3–1	1–2	1–1	0–2	1–0	—	0–2
FC St. Pauli	0–0	0–0	2–0	1–0	2–0	4–0	1–3	1–0	3–2	1–0	5–2	1–2	1–0	0–2	0–4	3–4	1–3	—

Source: DFB
Legend: Blue = home team win; Yellow = draw; Red = away team win.

== Promotion play-offs ==
The team which finished 16th faced the third-placed 2015–16 2. Bundesliga side for a two-legged play-off. The winner on aggregate score after both matches will earn entry into the 2016–17 Bundesliga.

=== First leg ===
19 May 2016
20:30 CEST

Eintracht Frankfurt	1–1	1. FC Nürnberg
Gaćinović 65'	Report	Russ 42' (o.g.)

Commerzbank-Arena, Frankfurt
Attendance: 51,500
Referee: Daniel Siebert (Berlin)

Eintracht Frankfurt	1. FC Nürnberg

GK	1	(Finland) Lukáš Hrádecký
RB	22	(United States) Timothy Chandler
CB	19	(Argentina) David Abraham
CB	4	(Germany) Marco Russ (c)	(yellow card) 56'
LB	6	(Germany) Bastian Oczipka
CM	20	(Japan) Makoto Hasebe
CM	8	(Hungary) Szabolcs Huszti
RW	16	(Germany) Stefan Aigner		(substituted off) 61'
AM	14	(Germany) Alexander Meier		(substituted off) 70'
LW	11	(Serbia) Mijat Gaćinović		(substituted off) 84'
CF	9	(Switzerland) Haris Seferovic
Substitutes:
GK	13	(Austria) Heinz Lindner
DF	2	(Germany) Yanni Regäsel
DF	5	(Peru) Carlos Zambrano
MF	21	(Germany) Marc Stendera		(substituted on) 70'
MF	27	(Serbia) Aleksandar Ignjovski
MF	32	(Tunisia) Änis Ben-Hatira		(substituted on) 61'
FW	30	(Netherlands) Luc Castaignos		(substituted on) 84'
Manager:
(Croatia) Niko Kovač

GK	1	(Germany) Raphael Schäfer	(yellow card) 57'
RB	2	(Slovenia) Mišo Brečko (c)
CB	33	(Austria) Georg Margreitter
CB	4	(Netherlands) Dave Bulthuis
LB	6	(Romania) László Sepsi
RM	17	(Germany) Sebastian Kerk		(substituted off) 74'
CM	31	(Czech Republic) Ondřej Petrák
CM	18	(Germany) Hanno Behrens
LM	23	(Germany) Tim Leibold		(substituted off) 89'
CF	24	(Germany) Niclas Füllkrug		(substituted off) 85'
CF	9	(Austria) Guido Burgstaller
Substitutes:
GK	22	(Germany) Patrick Rakovsky
DF	3	(Norway) Even Hovland		(substituted on) 85'
DF	28	(Germany) Lukas Mühl
MF	14	(Germany) Kevin Möhwald
MF	19	(Iceland) Rúrik Gíslason		(substituted on) 89'
FW	7	(Germany) Danny Blum		(substituted on) 74'
FW	36	(Germany) Cedric Teuchert
Manager:
(Switzerland) René Weiler

Assistant referees:
Florian Heft (Neuenkirchen)
Jan Seidel (Oberkrämer)
Fourth official:
Bibiana Steinhaus (Hanover)

Match rules:

- 90 minutes.
- Seven named substitutes, of which up to three may be used.

=== Second leg ===
23 May 2016
20:30 CEST

1. FC Nürnberg	0–1	Eintracht Frankfurt
	Report	Seferovic 66'

Grundig Stadion, Nuremberg
Attendance: 50,000
Referee: Christian Dingert (Lebecksmühle)

1. FC Nürnberg	Eintracht Frankfurt

GK	1	(Germany) Raphael Schäfer
RB	2	(Slovenia) Mišo Brečko (c)	(yellow card) 72'
CB	33	(Austria) Georg Margreitter
CB	4	(Netherlands) Dave Bulthuis
LB	6	(Romania) László Sepsi		(substituted off) 84'
RM	17	(Germany) Sebastian Kerk	(yellow card) 56'	(substituted off) 74'
CM	31	(Czech Republic) Ondřej Petrák		(substituted off) 74'
CM	18	(Germany) Hanno Behrens
LM	23	(Germany) Tim Leibold
CF	9	(Austria) Guido Burgstaller	(yellow card) 90+2'
CF	24	(Germany) Niclas Füllkrug
Substitutes:
GK	22	(Germany) Patrick Rakovsky
DF	3	(Norway) Even Hovland		(substituted on) 84'
DF	28	(Germany) Lukas Mühl
MF	14	(Germany) Kevin Möhwald
MF	19	(Iceland) Rúrik Gíslason		(substituted on) 74'
FW	7	(Germany) Danny Blum		(substituted on) 74'
FW	36	(Germany) Cedric Teuchert
Manager:
(Switzerland) René Weiler

GK	1	(Finland) Lukáš Hrádecký	(yellow card) 90+1'
RB	22	(United States) Timothy Chandler		(substituted off) 69'
CB	5	(Peru) Carlos Zambrano (c)
CB	19	(Argentina) David Abraham	(yellow card) 90+4'
LB	6	(Germany) Bastian Oczipka	(yellow card) 24'
CM	20	(Japan) Makoto Hasebe
CM	8	(Hungary) Szabolcs Huszti
RW	32	(Tunisia) Änis Ben-Hatira		(substituted off) 58'
AM	21	(Germany) Marc Stendera		(substituted off) 11'
LW	11	(Serbia) Mijat Gaćinović
CF	9	(Switzerland) Haris Seferovic	(yellow card) 76'
Substitutes:
GK	13	(Austria) Heinz Lindner
DF	2	(Germany) Yanni Regäsel
MF	10	(Mexico) Marco Fabián	(yellow card) 51'	(substituted on) 11'
MF	16	(Germany) Stefan Aigner
MF	27	(Serbia) Aleksandar Ignjovski		(substituted on) 69'
FW	14	(Germany) Alexander Meier		(substituted on) 58'
FW	30	(Netherlands) Luc Castaignos
Manager:
(Croatia) Niko Kovač

Assistant referees:
Tobias Christ (Münchweiler an der Rodalb)
Arne Aarnink (Nordhorn)
Fourth official:
Bastian Dankert (Rostock)

Match rules:

- 90 minutes.
- 30 minutes of extra time if tied on aggregate and away goals.
- Penalty shoot-out if no further goals are scored.
- Seven named substitutes, of which up to three may be used.

Eintracht Frankfurt won 2–1 on aggregate.

== Relegation play-offs ==
The team which finished sixteenth faced the third-placed 2015–16 3. Liga side for a two-legged play-off. The winner on aggregate score after both matches earned entry into the 2016–17 2. Bundesliga.

=== First leg ===
20 May 2016
19:10 CEST

Würzburger Kickers	2–0	MSV Duisburg
Weil 10' (pen.); Nagy 79'	Report

flyeralarm Arena, Würzburg
Attendance: 9,806
Referee: Sascha Stegemann (Niederkassel)

Würzburger Kickers
MSV Duisburg

GK	28	(Poland) Robert Wulnikowski (c)
RB	22	(Germany) Dennis Russ		(substituted off) 74'
CB	11	(Germany) Richard Weil
CB	5	(Germany) Clemens Schoppenhauer
LB	16	(Germany) Peter Kurzweg
CM	30	(Germany) Emanuel Taffertshofer
CM	26	(United States) Royal-Dominique Fennell
RW	10	(Germany) Nejmeddin Daghfous
AM	4	(Germany) Rico Benatelli
LW	14	(Greece) Joannis Karsanidis		(substituted off) 57'
CF	33	(Italy) Elia Soriano		(substituted off) 70'
Substitutes:
GK	1	(Germany) Dominik Brunnhübner
DF	32	(Germany) Lukas Billick
MF	2	(Germany) Dennis Schmitt
MF	7	(Germany) Marco Haller		(substituted on) 57'
MF	9	(Iran) Amir Shapourzadeh		(substituted on) 74'
MF	20	(Hungary) Dániel Nagy	(yellow card) 76'	(substituted on) 70'
FW	27	(Germany) Adam Jabiri
Manager:
(Germany) Bernd Hollerbach

GK	30	(Germany) Marcel Lenz
RB	28	(Germany) Steffen Bohl
CB	25	(Germany) Thomas Meißner
CB	5	(Bosnia and Herzegovina) Branimir Bajić (c)	(yellow card) 8'
LB	27	(Germany) Dan-Patrick Poggenberg
RM	36	(Georgia (country)) Giorgi Chanturia		(substituted off) 75'
CM	23	(Australia) James Holland
CM	3	(Germany) Enis Hajri
LM	17	(Germany) Kevin Wolze		(substituted off) 86'
CF	10	(Nigeria) Kingsley Onuegbu	(yellow card) 9'	(substituted off) 53'
CF	11	(Russia) Stanislav Iljutcenko
Substitutes:
GK	39	(Senegal) Timothy Dieng
DF	21	(Venezuela) Rolf Feltscher
MF	13	(Germany) Zlatko Janjić
MF	14	(Germany) Tim Albutat
MF	19	(Germany) Nico Klotz		(substituted on) 75'
FW	8	(Germany) Thomas Bröker		(substituted on) 86'
FW	33	(Germany) Kevin Scheidhauer		(substituted on) 53'
Manager:
(Bulgaria) Iliya Gruev

- Assistant referees:
  - Christian Fischer (Hemer)
  - Sören Storks (Ramsdorf)
- Fourth official:
  - Robert Schröder (Hanover)

Match rules:

- 90 minutes.
- Seven named substitutes, of which up to three may be used.

=== Second leg ===
24 May 2016
19:10 CEST

MSV Duisburg	1–2	Würzburger Kickers
Schoppenhauer 33' (o.g.)	Report	Soriano 37'; Benatelli 90+2'

Schauinsland-Reisen-Arena, Duisburg
Attendance: 29,500
Referee: Tobias Stieler (Hamburg)

MSV Duisburg
Würzburger Kickers

GK	30	(Germany) Marcel Lenz
CB	25	(Germany) Thomas Meißner
CB	23	(Australia) James Holland
CB	3	(Germany) Enis Hajri
RM	21	(Venezuela) Rolf Feltscher
CM	36	(Georgia (country)) Giorgi Chanturia		(substituted off) 56'
CM	14	(Germany) Tim Albutat		(substituted off) 73'
CM	17	(Germany) Kevin Wolze	(yellow card) 67'	(substituted off) 71'
LM	27	(Germany) Dan-Patrick Poggenberg
CF	15	(Nigeria) Victor Obinna	(red card) 89'
CF	10	(Nigeria) Kingsley Onuegbu (c)
Substitutes:
GK	39	(Senegal) Timothy Dieng
DF	28	(Germany) Steffen Bohl
MF	13	(Germany) Zlatko Janjić
MF	19	(Germany) Nico Klotz		(substituted on) 56'
MF	38	(Germany) Barış Özbek
FW	8	(Germany) Thomas Bröker		(substituted on) 71'
FW	11	(Russia) Stanislav Iljutcenko		(substituted on) 73'
Manager:
(Bulgaria) Iliya Gruev

GK	28	(Poland) Robert Wulnikowski (c)
RB	11	(Germany) Richard Weil
CB	5	(Germany) Clemens Schoppenhauer
CB	26	(United States) Royal-Dominique Fennell	(yellow card) 64'
LB	16	(Germany) Peter Kurzweg	(yellow card) 22'	(substituted off) 72'
CM	30	(Germany) Emanuel Taffertshofer
CM	4	(Germany) Rico Benatelli
RW	22	(Germany) Dennis Russ
AM	14	(Greece) Joannis Karsanidis	(yellow card) 81'	(substituted off) 83'
LW	7	(Germany) Marco Haller
CF	33	(Italy) Elia Soriano		(substituted off) 88'
Substitutes:
GK	1	(Germany) Dominik Brunnhübner
DF	3	(Germany) Dominik Nothnagel		(substituted on) 72'
DF	6	(Germany) Niklas Weißenberger
DF	32	(Germany) Lukas Billick		(substituted on) 83'
MF	9	(Iran) Amir Shapourzadeh
MF	18	(Germany) Nico Gutjahr
FW	27	(Germany) Adam Jabiri		(substituted on) 88'
Manager:
(Germany) Bernd Hollerbach

- Assistant referees:
  - Sascha Thielert (Buchholz in der Nordheide)
  - Harm Osmers (Hanover)
- Fourth official:
  - Frank Willenborg (Osnabrück)

Match rules:

- 90 minutes.
- 30 minutes of extra time if tied on aggregate and away goals.
- Penalty shoot-out if no further goals are scored.
- Seven named substitutes, of which up to three may be used.

Würzburger Kickers won 4–1 on aggregate.

== Player statistics ==
=== Top goalscorers ===
Rank	Player	Club	Goals
1	(Germany) Simon Terodde	VfL Bochum	25
2	(Germany) Nils Petersen	SC Freiburg	21
3	(United States) Bobby Wood	Union Berlin	17
5	(Germany) Niclas Füllkrug	Nürnberg	14
5	(Italy) Vincenzo Grifo	SC Freiburg	14
7	(Austria) Guido Burgstaller	Nürnberg	13
8	(Germany) Sebastian Freis	Greuther Fürth	12
8	(Germany) Fabian Klos	Arminia Bielefeld	12
8	(Croatia) Damir Kreilach	Union Berlin	12
11	(Germany) Kerem Demirbay	Fortuna Düsseldorf	10
11	(Germany) Robert Leipertz	1. FC Heidenheim	10
11	(Germany) Davie Selke	RB Leipzig	10

=== Hat-tricks ===
Player	Club	Against	Result	Date	Ref
(Germany) Nils Petersen	SC Freiburg	1. FC Nürnberg	6−3	27 July 2015	
(Germany) Lennart Thy^{4}	FC St. Pauli	Fortuna Düsseldorf	4−0	9 November 2015	
(Germany) Nils Petersen	SC Freiburg	SC Paderborn	4−1	22 November 2015	
(Austria) Rubin Okotie	1860 Munich	SC Paderborn	4−4	28 November 2015	
(Germany) Niclas Füllkrug	1. FC Nürnberg	Union Berlin	6−2	23 April 2016	
(Germany) Simon Terodde	VfL Bochum	1. FC Heidenheim	4−2	15 May 2016	

^{4}Player scored four goals

== Attendances ==
No.	Team	Attendance	Change	Highest
1	1. FC Nürnberg	30,724	-0.1%	50,000
2	RB Leipzig	29,441	17.6%	42,559
3	FC St. Pauli	29,354	19.1%	29,546
4	Fortuna 95	25,897	-13.5%	34,688
5	1. FC Kaiserslautern	25,872	-21.6%	33,036
6	TSV 1860	23,359	6.6%	54,100
7	SC Freiburg	23,318	-2.0%	24,000
8	BTSV Eintracht	21,193	-1.9%	23,050
9	1. FC Union Berlin	19,754	3.2%	22,012
10	MSV Duisburg	17,889	32.5%	28,500
11	VfL Bochum	17,834	5.8%	27,561
12	Arminia Bielefeld	17,534	20.6%	25,064
13	Karlsruher SC	16,019	-7.8%	25,297
14	1. FC Heidenheim	12,808	1.8%	14,800
15	SC Paderborn 07	10,929	-26.4%	15,000
16	Greuther Fürth	10,268	-12.9%	17,200
17	FSV Frankfurt	6,553	-1.2%	12,542
18	SV Sandhausen	6,229	5.0%	10,515
