= Ilia Gruev =

Ilia Gruev may refer to:

- Ilia Gruev (footballer, born 2000), Bulgarian international footballer

or his father:

- Iliya Gruev (born 1969), Bulgarian international footballer and manager
