= Heunischenburg =

Stone fortification

Coordinates: 50°14′33″N 11°15′55″E

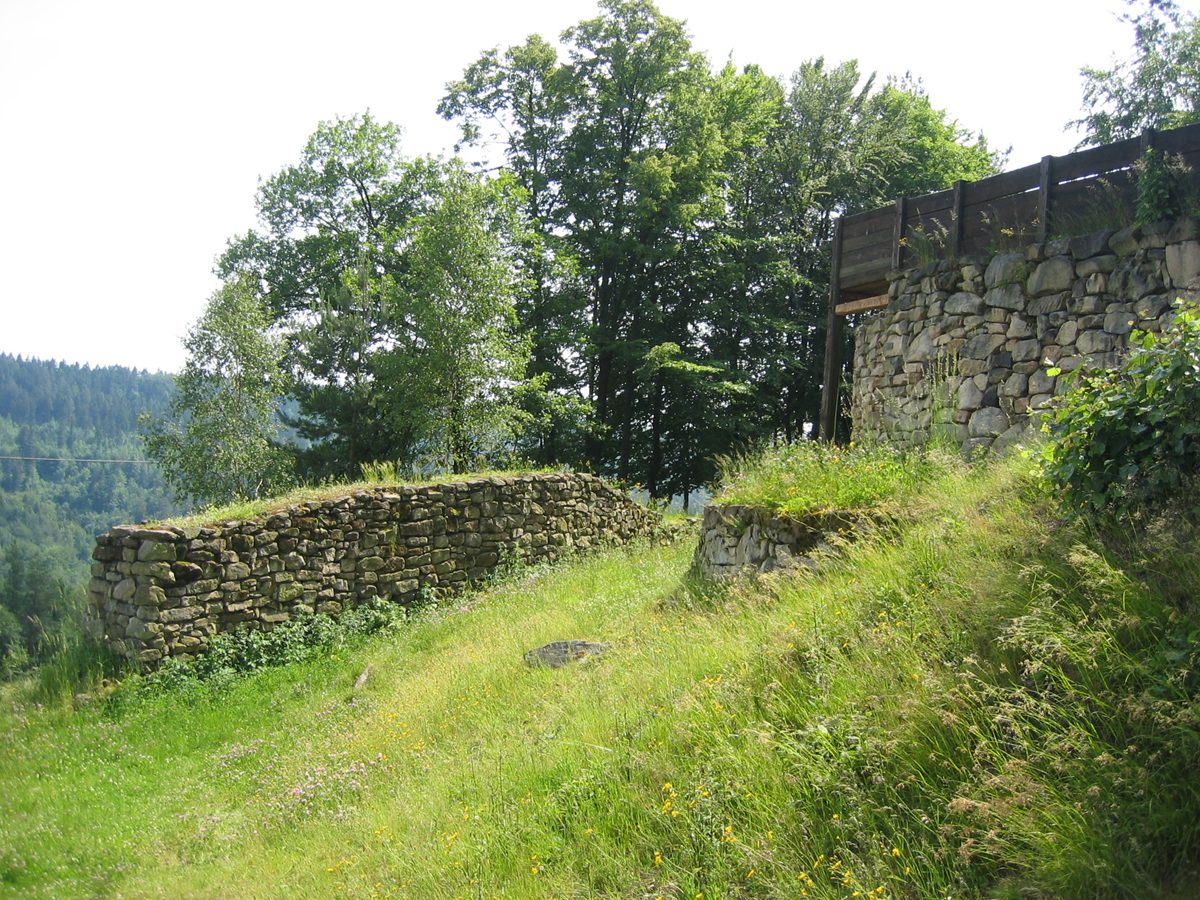
The Heunischenburg near Gehülz (Kronach)

The Heunischenburg is a stone fortification of the late Urnfield period near the Upper Franconian town of Kronach in Germany. Its heyday was in the 9th century BC, making it the oldest stone fortification north of the Alps that is known and archaeologically investigated.

== Topographical situation ==
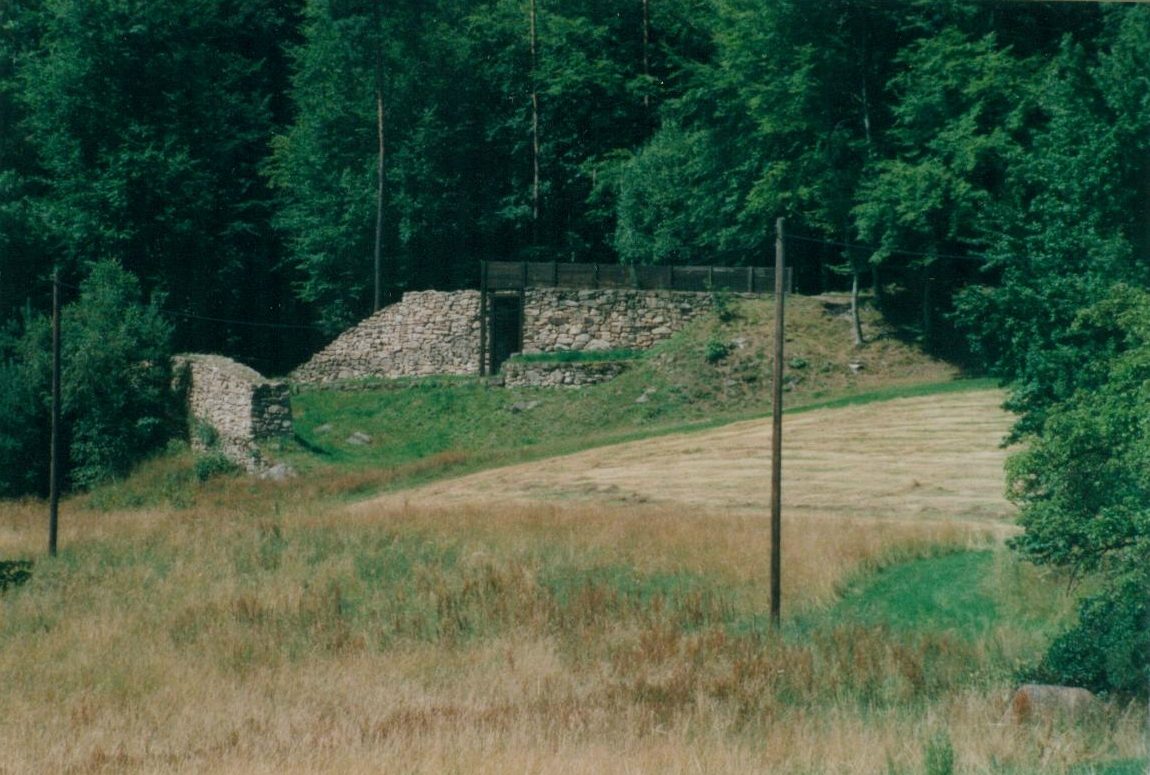
Front view of the Heunischenburg

The fort is located on a 486-metre-high hill spur of the Wolfsberg, between the Kronach quarter of Gehülz and the village of Burgstall (Mitwitz). The fort probably guarded a copper and tin trading route in the Fichtel Mountains.

While a mighty, 110-metre-long rampart protected the vulnerable eastern flank of the military camp, on the other sides the steeply sloping sides of the spur offer a natural protection that was reinforced by a wooden palisade.

The typical features of a pincer gate and sally port suggest a late Mycenaean influence, so that contacts to the Mediterranean civilisation can be assumed.

The strong, but small fort and the many weapons found distinguish the Heunischenburg clearly from the great centres of settlement of the late Bronze Age.

== Name ==
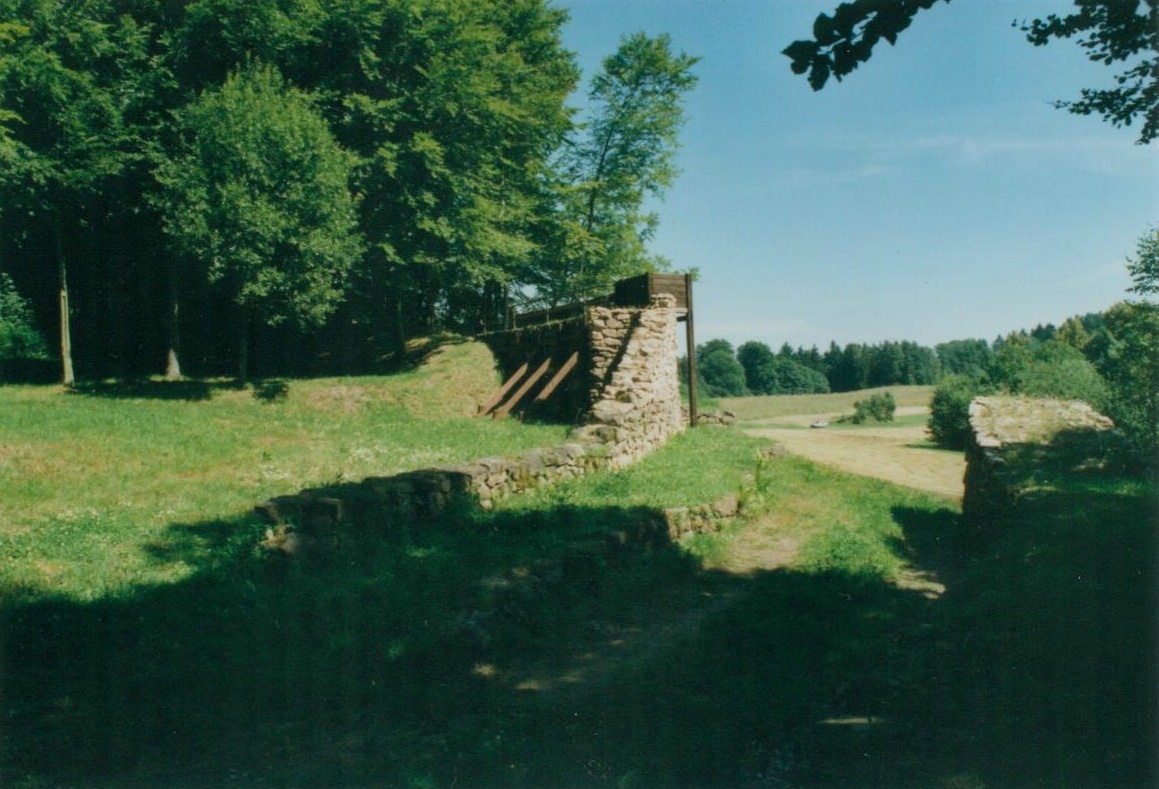
The Heunischenburg with a view through the gateway looking east

Two meanings have been proposed:

1. the term Heunen could refer to a grey, legendary thing from an earlier time.
2. the root word Heunen (Hünen 'giant') could refer to legendary giant builders of the fortification imagined by the people of the Middle Ages.

== History ==
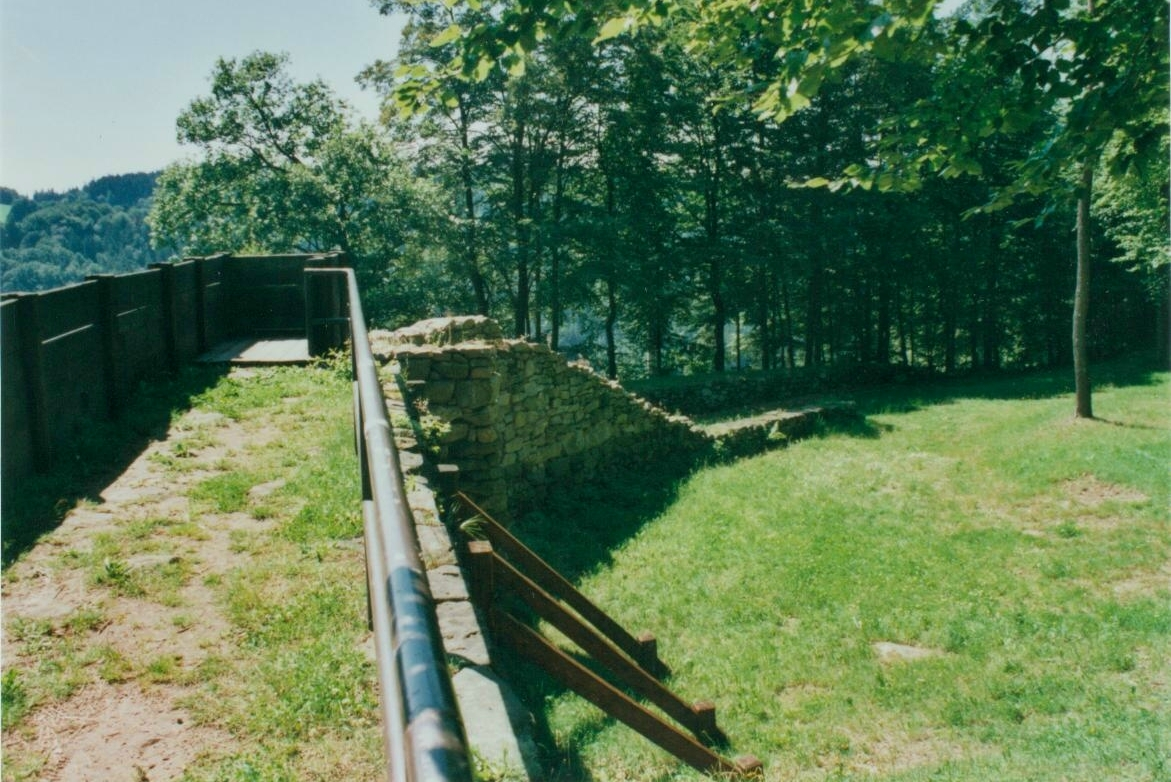
View from above the reconstructed wall

Excavations indicate three periods of settlement:

- In the first period (10th century BC) the Heunischenburg was constructed as a palisaded fortification.
- In the second period (10th century BC) the defences were reinforced with a sandstone wall that probably burned down during a battle.
- In the third period (9th century) the Heunischenburg was expanded into a strong hillfort.

The northeastern flank was guarded by a 2.6-metre-wide, 3.5-metre-high and 110-metre long wall made of sandstone. This was in turn protected by a 3.5-metre-wide berm and a shallow ditch The wall on the inner side of the pincer gateway is only of single-leaf construction. The outer wall either side of the gateway approach on the hillside, was 2 metres wide and continued as a 55-metre-long wooden defensive breastwork. This probably enclosed the entire site. The gateway had a 1-metre-wide portal at the rear with a projecting wooden tower.

=== Excavations ===
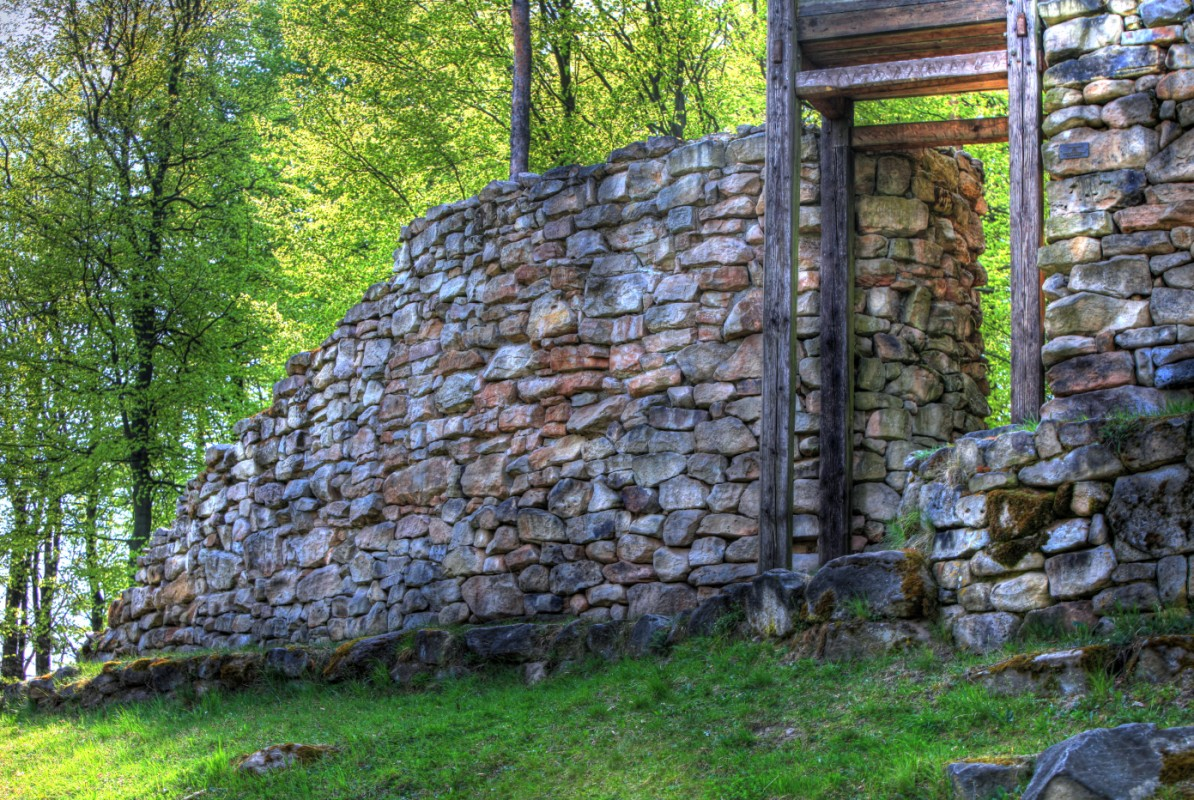
Reconstructed entrance

The archaeological dating of the site is based on numerous bronze finds, about 70% of which are weapons. There are also needles, rings, razors, decorative discs, fragments of wrought lead, pieces of swords, lance points and arrowheads. Because many arrowheads were found that had not been deburred, it is suspected that there were times when there was an extremely high consumption of munitions in the garrison. A helmet of the Urnfield period was found at nearby Thonberg.

=== Reconstruction ===
In 1986 and 2000, based on clear evidence, a reconstruction was carried out of a section of wall of the final fortification phase with a berm in front, the gateway with its wooden tower and the gateway cul-de-sac which extended for some way into the interior of the fort.

== Literature ==
- Björn-Uwe Abels: The Heunischenburg near Kronach. Eine späturnenfelderzeitliche Befestigung. Univ.-Verl., Regensburg, 2002, ISBN 3-930480-28-X.
