= Sebastian Borger =

German journalist (born 1964)

Sebastian Borger (born 1964 in Kronach) is a German journalist and author based in London.

== Life ==
Having attended the Hamburg school of journalism Henri-Nannen-Schule from 1987 to 1988, Sebastian Borger started his career in journalism in 1989 as a crime reporter for Abendzeitung in Munich. From 1991 to 1995 he worked for news magazine Der Spiegel, both in Hamburg and Dresden.

Since graduating from the London School of Economics and Political Science in 1998, he has worked as independent adviser and London correspondent for a number of German-speaking publications, amongst them Berliner Zeitung, Der Standard and regional Swiss newspapers.

Borger is a regular pundit on German-British and international topics for the BBC.

== Publications ==
- „Verzockt – Kweku Adoboli und die UBS", Stämpfli Verlag Bern 2013, ISBN 978-3-7272-1245-1
