= Luis Zwick =

German footballer

Personal information
- Full name: Luis Maria Zwick
- Date of birth: 24 May 1994 (age 32)
- Place of birth: Berlin, Germany
- Height: 1.93 m (6 ft 4 in)
- Position: Goalkeeper

Team information
- Current team: VSG Altglienicke
- Number: 1

Youth career
- 2001–2009: Teltower FV 1913
- 2009–2013: Hertha Zehlendorf

Senior career*
Years	Team	Apps	(Gls)
2013–2014	Hertha Zehlendorf	32	(0)
2014–2017	Dundee United	17	(0)
2017–2018	Hansa Rostock	0	(0)
2017	→ Hertha Berlin II (loan)	7	(0)
2018–2019	Optik Rathenow	24	(0)
2019–2022	Schweinfurt 05	42	(0)
2022–2024	Berliner AK 07	62	(0)
2024–	VSG Altglienicke	36	(0)
- * Club domestic league appearances and goals as of 23 September 2026

Luis Maria Zwick (born 24 May 1994) is a German professional footballer who plays as a goalkeeper for VSG Altglienicke.

Zwick rose to prominence at the age of 21 after winning the starting spot at Dundee United, making 17 appearances in the Scottish Premiership. Following the arrival of Japanese international Eiji Kawashima, Zwick moved to German 3. Liga club Hansa Rostock. With playing time limited, he joined Hertha Berlin II on loan and in 2018, parted ways with parent club, Rostock. After a season with Optik Rathenow, he signed for Bayern powerhouses, Schweinfurt.

== Early life ==
Born in Berlin, Germany, Zwick played for Teltower FV 1913, a youth football team, from the age of seven. Zwick began his career as a left midfielder, before becoming a goalkeeper in 2007. He moved to Hertha 03 Zehlendorf in 2009.

== Career ==
Zwick signed for his first professional football club in 2014, playing for the development squad of Dundee United in Scotland. In 2015, he signed a professional contract with the club. He made his senior début on 2 August 2015, in a 1–0 loss to Aberdeen in the opening match of the 2015–16 Scottish Premiership season. On 8 August, Zwick kept a clean sheet in a 2–0 away win against Motherwell, on his second appearance for United.

Zwick was released by Dundee United when his contract expired at the end of the 2016–17 season. Returning to Germany, he signed for 3. Liga club Hansa Rostock in June 2017. Two months later, he left Rostock without having earned made any appearances and joined fourth tier club Hertha BSC II on a season-long loan.

After parting ways with Rostock following his loan spell with Hertha II, he joined FSV Optik Rathenow. There, a series of strong performances helped the club escape relegation and lead him to sign a three-year contract with Regionalliga Bayern powerhouse side, FC Schweinfurt. In 2020-21, Zwick captained Schweinfurt in the first-round proper of the DFB Pokal against Bundesliga side, Schalke 04, losing 4-1.

== Career statistics ==
As of match played 28 May 2017

Appearances and goals by club, season and competition
Club	Season	League			National Cup		League Cup		Other		Total	
Club	Season	Division	Apps	Goals	Apps	Goals	Apps	Goals	Apps	Goals	Apps	Goals
Dundee United	2015–16	Scottish Premiership	13	0	1	0	1	0	–		15	0
Dundee United	2016–17	Scottish Championship	4	0	0	0	0	0	4 (Note: Appearances in Scottish Challenge Cup)	0	8	0
Dundee United	Total		17	0	1	0	1	0	4	0	23	0
Hansa Rostock	2017–18	3. Liga	0	0	0	0	—		0	0	0	0
Hertha Berlin II (loan)	2017–18	Regionalliga Nordost	3	0	—		—		—		3	0
Career total			20	0	1	0	1	0	4	0	26	0

== Honours ==
Dundee United

- Scottish Challenge Cup: 2016–17

1. FC Schweinfurt 05

- Regionalliga Bayern: 2019–21
