= Kristian Böhnlein =

German footballer

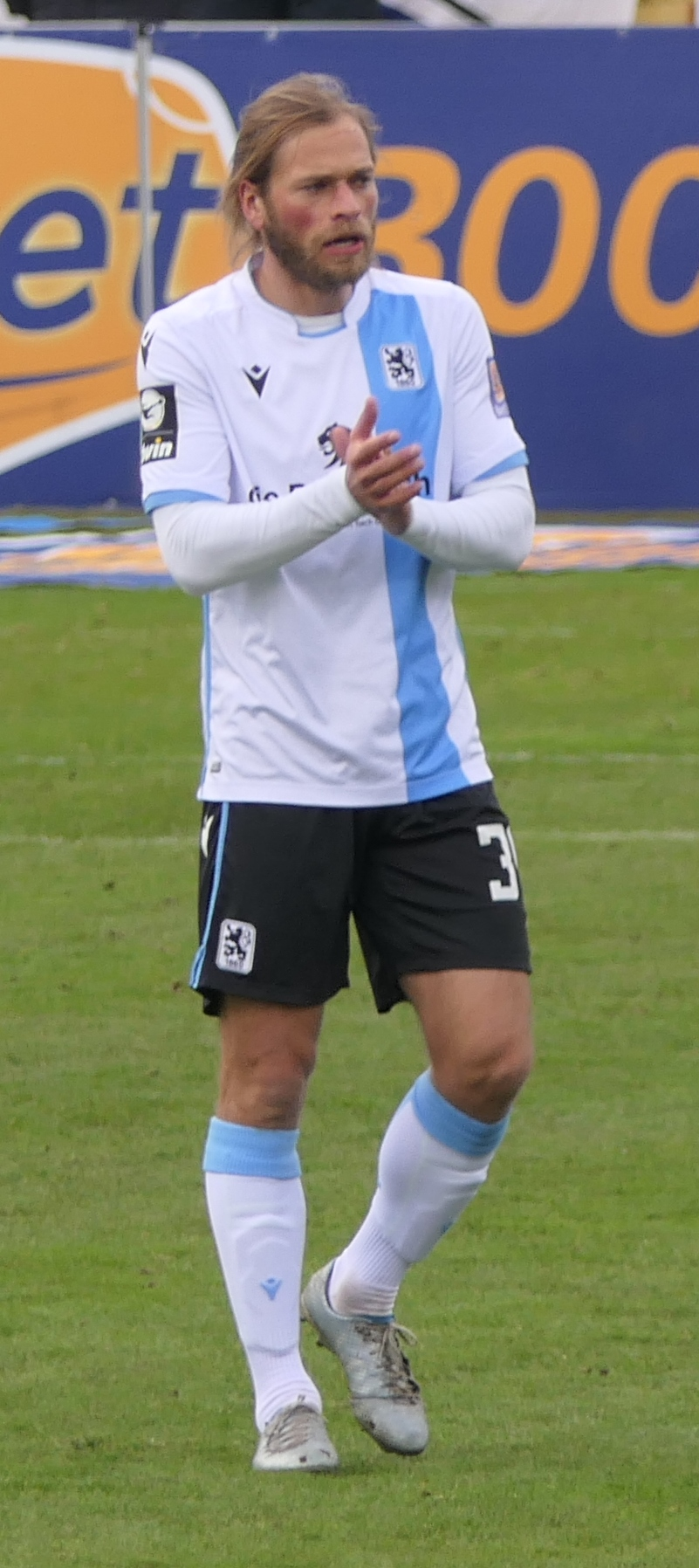
- Böhnlein in 2020

Personal information
- Full name: Kristian Böhnlein
- Date of birth: 10 May 1990 (age 36)
- Place of birth: Kronach, West Germany
- Height: 1.83 m (6 ft 0 in)
- Position: Midfielder

Team information
- Current team: 1. FC Schweinfurt 05
- Number: 13

Youth career
- –2005: SV Friesen
- 2005–2009: Hamburger SV

Senior career*
| Years | Team | Apps | (Gls) |
| 2009–2010 | Hamburger SV II | 4 | (0) |
| 2010–2011 | Greuther Fürth II | 15 | (1) |
| 2011–2014 | VfL Frohnlach | 90 | (21) |
| 2014–2018 | SpVgg Bayreuth | 126 | (22) |
| 2018–2020 | 1860 Munich | 12 | (1) |
| 2018–2020 | 1860 Munich II | 15 | (6) |
| 2020– | 1. FC Schweinfurt 05 | 171 | (19) |
- * Club domestic league appearances and goals as of 30 May 2026

Kristian Böhnlein (born 10 May 1990) is a German professional footballer who plays as a midfielder for 1. FC Schweinfurt 05.

== Career ==
Böhnlein made his professional debut for 1860 Munich on 19 August 2018, appearing in the first round of the 2018–19 DFB-Pokal against 2. Bundesliga side Holstein Kiel, which finished as a 1–3 home loss.

He signed for 1. FC Schweinfurt 05 in the summer of 2020.

== Honours ==
- Regionalliga Bayern: 2019–21
