= Nico Rinderknecht =

German footballer

Personal information
- Full name: Nico Ingo Rinderknecht
- Date of birth: 11 October 1997 (age 29)
- Place of birth: Giessen, Germany
- Height: 1.82 m (5 ft 11 1/2 in)
- Position: Defensive midfielder

Team information
- Current team: SG Barockstadt
- Number: 7

Youth career
- 2002–2003: SpVgg Blau-Weiss Gießen
- 2003–2004: ASV Gießen
- 2004–2010: VfB Gießen
- 2010–2011: TSG Wieseck
- 2011–2016: Eintracht Frankfurt

Senior career*
Years	Team	Apps	(Gls)
2015–2016	Eintracht Frankfurt	1	(0)
2016–2019	FC Ingolstadt	0	(0)
2016–2019	FC Ingolstadt II	44	(8)
2017–2018	→ Preußen Münster (loan)	14	(2)
2019–2020	FC Gießen	19	(0)
2020–2022	1. FC Schweinfurt 05	28	(1)
2022–2023	SV Donaustauf	13	(0)
2023–	SG Barockstadt	21	(0)
- * Club domestic league appearances and goals as of 29 April 2024

Nico Ingo Rinderknecht (born 11 October 1997) is a German footballer who plays as a defensive midfielder for Regionalliga Südwest club SG Barockstadt Fulda-Lehnerz.

== Club career ==
Rinderknecht made his Bundesliga debut on 13 December 2015 against Borussia Dortmund replacing David Abraham after 85 minutes in a 4–1 away defeat.

== Honours ==
- Regionalliga Bayern: 2019–21
