= Malik McLemore =

German footballer (born 1997)

Personal information
- Full name: Malik Jordan McLemore
- Date of birth: 16 January 1997 (age 29)
- Place of birth: Wiesbaden, Germany
- Height: 1.80 m (5 ft 11 in)
- Positions: Forward; attacking midfielder

Team information
- Current team: Lokomotive Leipzig
- Number: 10

Youth career
- –2014: TuS Nordenstadt
- 2014–2015: Wehen Wiesbaden
- 2015–2016: SV Gonsenheim

Senior career*
Years	Team	Apps	(Gls)
2015–2017	SV Gonsenheim	16	(2)
2017–2019	Bayern Hof	59	(14)
2019–2020	Greuther Fürth II	17	(3)
2019–2020	Greuther Fürth	1	(0)
2020–2021	Union Fürstenwalde	6	(1)
2021–2023	1. FC Schweinfurt 05	46	(6)
2023–2024	FSV Frankfurt	19	(4)
2024	El Paso Locomotive	4	(1)
2025–	Lokomotive Leipzig	16	(2)
- * Club domestic league appearances and goals as of 22 June 2026

Malik Jordan McLemore (born 16 January 1997) is a German professional footballer who plays as an attacking midfielder for Lokomotive Leipzig in Regionalliga Nordost.

== Career ==
McLemore made his professional debut for Greuther Fürth in the 2. Bundesliga on 8 March 2020, coming on as a substitute in the 83rd minute for Kenny Prince Redondo in the away match against Holstein Kiel, which finished as a 1–1 draw. In July 2021, he signed for tier-four Regionalliga Bayern club 1. FC Schweinfurt 05.
