= Markus Gellhaus =

German association football player (born 1970)

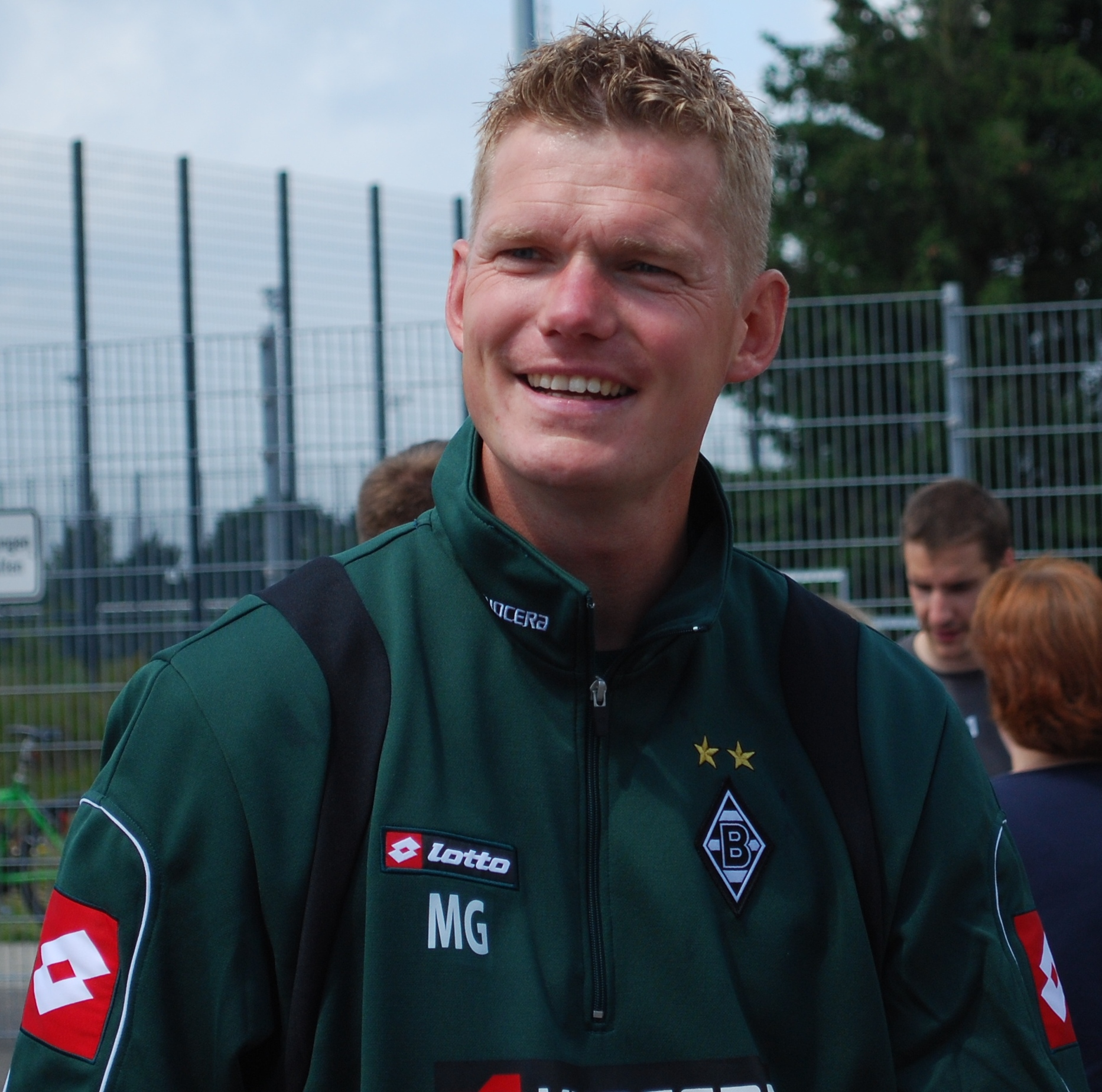

Personal information
- Date of birth: 9 June 1970 (age 56)
- Position: Midfielder

Team information
- Current team: Borussia Mönchengladbach (assistant)

Senior career*
| Years | Team | Apps | (Gls) |
- SV Steinheim
- TuS Paderborn Neuhaus
| 1988–1989 | TBV Lemgo | | |
- BV Bad Lippspringe

Managerial career
- 2001: SC Paderborn 07
- 2006: SC Paderborn 07
- 2015: SC Paderborn 07
- 2024–2025: Samsunspor (assistant)
- * Club domestic league appearances and goals

Markus Gellhaus (born 9 June 1970) is a former German football player and manager, he is the currently assistant coach of Bundesliga club Borussia Mönchengladbach.

== Playing career ==
He played for SC Paderborn during his career.

== Coaching career ==
=== Early career ===
He held several positions, including as an interim head coach and an assistant, during his time in SC Paderborn, before working together with Jos Luhukay as his assistant in Borussia Mönchengladbach, FC Augsburg and Hertha BSC.

=== SC Paderborn ===
He was appointed as the head coach on 13 June 2015, signing a two-year contract until 2017. He was sacked on 6 October 2015.
