= Denis Bushuev =

German football manager

Personal information
- Full name: Denis Dmitrievich Bushuev
- Date of birth: 15 February 1982 (age 44)
- Place of birth: Leningrad, Russian SFSR, Soviet Union
- Height: 1.83 m (6 ft 0 in)

Youth career
- –1998: Zenit Saint Petersburg

Senior career*
Years	Team	Apps	(Gls)
1998–1999	Zenit-2 Saint Petersburg	?	(?)
1999–2003	Hertha BSC II	39	(4)
2003–2004	Rot-Weiß Oberhausen	0	(0)
2003–2004	Rot-Weiß Oberhausen II	11	(0)
2004–2006	1860 Munich	0	(0)
2004–2006	1860 Munich II	4	(0)
2006–2014	TSV Hilgertshausen		

International career
2003	Russia U21	2	(0)

Managerial career
- 2005-2007: 1860 Munich U16
- 2007-2009: 1860 Munich U17
- 2009-2010: 1860 Munich U19
- 2010-2011: 1860 Munich (coach, scout)
- 2011-2013: 1860 Munich (assistant)
- 2013: 1860 Munich II (assistant)
- 2015: 1860 Munich (scout)
- 2015-2017: 1860 Munich II (assistant)
- 2016: 1860 Munich (interim)
- 2018: Russia U18 (team coach)
- 2020–2021: Leningradets
- 2022: Veles Moscow
- * Club domestic league appearances and goals

Denis Dmitrievich Bushuev (Russian: Денис Дмитриевич Бушуев; born 15 February 1982) is a German football manager whose career has been mostly in Germany, and a former player.

== Coaching career ==
On 9 May 2016, Bushuev became head coach of 1860 Munich as interim manager. He managed one match, a 2–1 loss against FSV Frankfurt in the 2. Bundesliga.
