= Lukas Billick =

German footballer

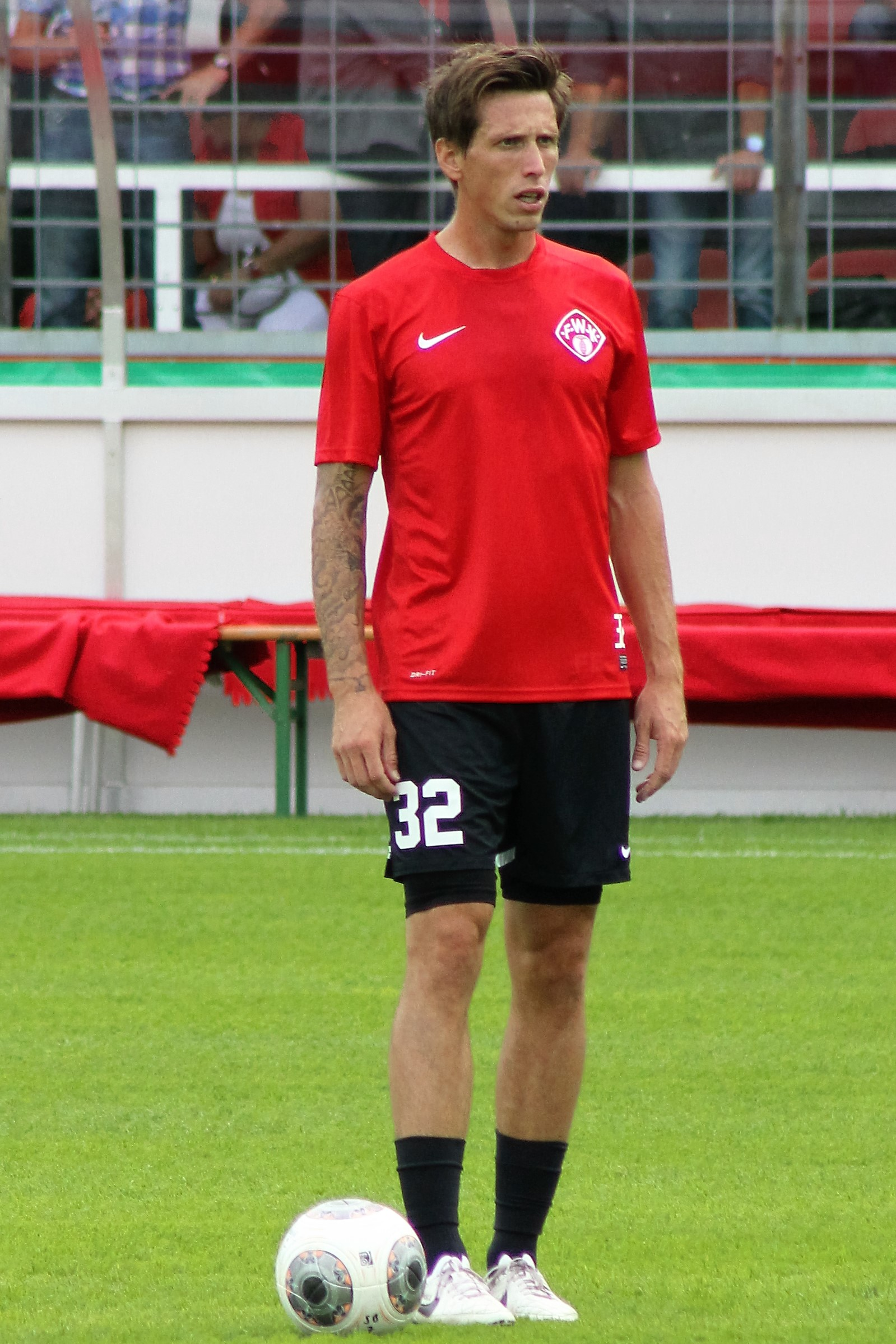
- Lukas Billick in 2014.

Personal information
- Date of birth: 9 February 1988 (age 38)
- Place of birth: West Germany
- Position: Right-back

Team information
- Current team: 1. FC Schweinfurt 05
- Number: 32

Youth career
- SG Wald-Michelbach
- SV Beerfelden
- –2007: Eintracht Wald-Michelbach

Senior career*
Years	Team	Apps	(Gls)
2007–2011	SV Wehen Wiesbaden II	72	(1)
2009–2011	SV Wehen Wiesbaden	25	(0)
2011–2014	SV Elversberg	107	(1)
2014–2016	Würzburger Kickers	51	(0)
2016	SV Eintracht Trier 05	0	(0)
2016–	1. FC Schweinfurt 05	164	(3)
- * Club domestic league appearances and goals as of 1 May 2024

Lukas Billick (born 9 February 1988) is a German footballer who plays as a defender for 1. FC Schweinfurt 05.

== Honours ==
Würzburger Kickers

- 3. Liga: Third place 2015–16 (promotion to 2. Bundesliga)
- Regionalliga Bayern: Champion 2014–15
- Bavarian Cup: Winner 2015–16

1. FC Schweinfurt 05

- Regionalliga Bayern: Champion 2019–21
- Bavarian Cup: (2) Winner 2016–17, 2017–18
