= Kronach =

- Town
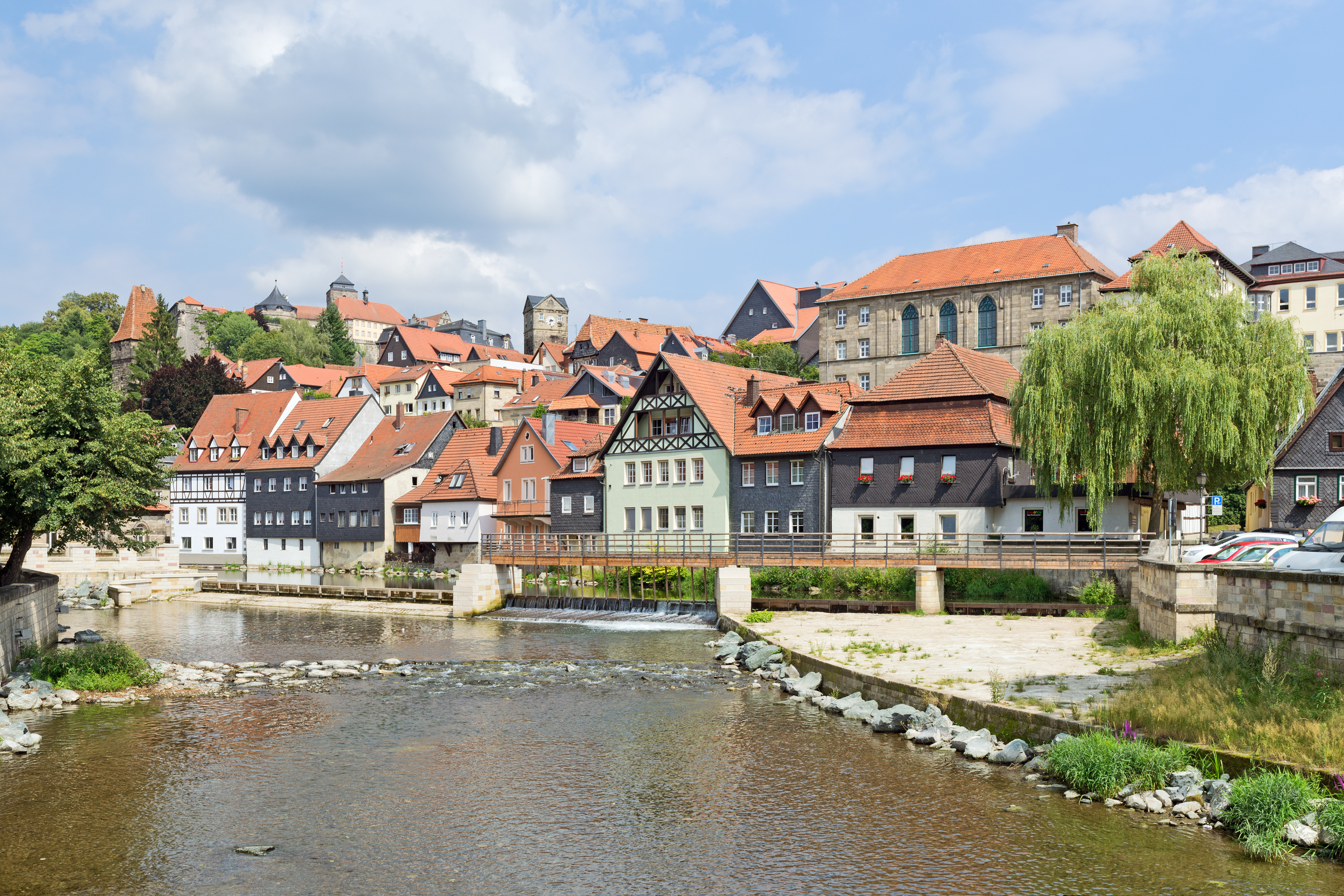
- Historical town centre with the Haßlach River

- Coat of arms

- Location of Kronach within Kronach district
- Interactive map of Kronach
- Location within Germany Location within Bavaria
- Coordinates: 50°14′28″N 11°19′41″E
- Country: Germany
- State: Bavaria
- Admin. region: Oberfranken
- District: Kronach

Government
  - Mayor (2020–26): Angela Hofmann (CSU)

Area
  - Total: 66.98 km^{2} (25.86 sq mi)
- Elevation: 318 m (1,043 ft)

Population (2025-12-31)
  - Total: 16,497
  - Density: 246.3/km^{2} (637.9/sq mi)
- Time zone: UTC+01:00 (CET)
  - Summer (DST): UTC+02:00 (CEST)
- Postal codes: 96317
- Dialling codes: 09261
- Vehicle registration: KC
- Website: www.kronach.de

Kronach (German pronunciation: [ˈkʁoːnax]; East Franconian: Gronich) is a town in Upper Franconia, Germany, located in the Franconian Forest area. It is the capital of the district Kronach.

The town is surrounded by a nearly complete city wall and Germany's biggest and most complete early modern fortress, Rosenberg Fortress. The headquarters of German television and AV equipment manufacturer Loewe are located there.

== Geography ==
=== Location ===
Kronach is located at the southwestern edge of the Franconian Forest. The rivers Haßlach, Kronach and Rodach unite in Kronach.

=== Town districts ===
Kronach is divided into the following districts:

- Bernsroth
- Birkach
- Blumau
- Dennach
- Dörfles
- Fischbach
- Friesen
- Gehülz
- Glosberg
- Gundelsdorf
- Höfles
- Kestel
- Knellendorf
- Kreuzberg
- Krugsberg
- Neuses
- Ruppen
- Seelabach
- Seelach
- Stübental
- Vogtendorf
- Vonz
- Wötzelsdorf
- Ziegelerden

== History ==
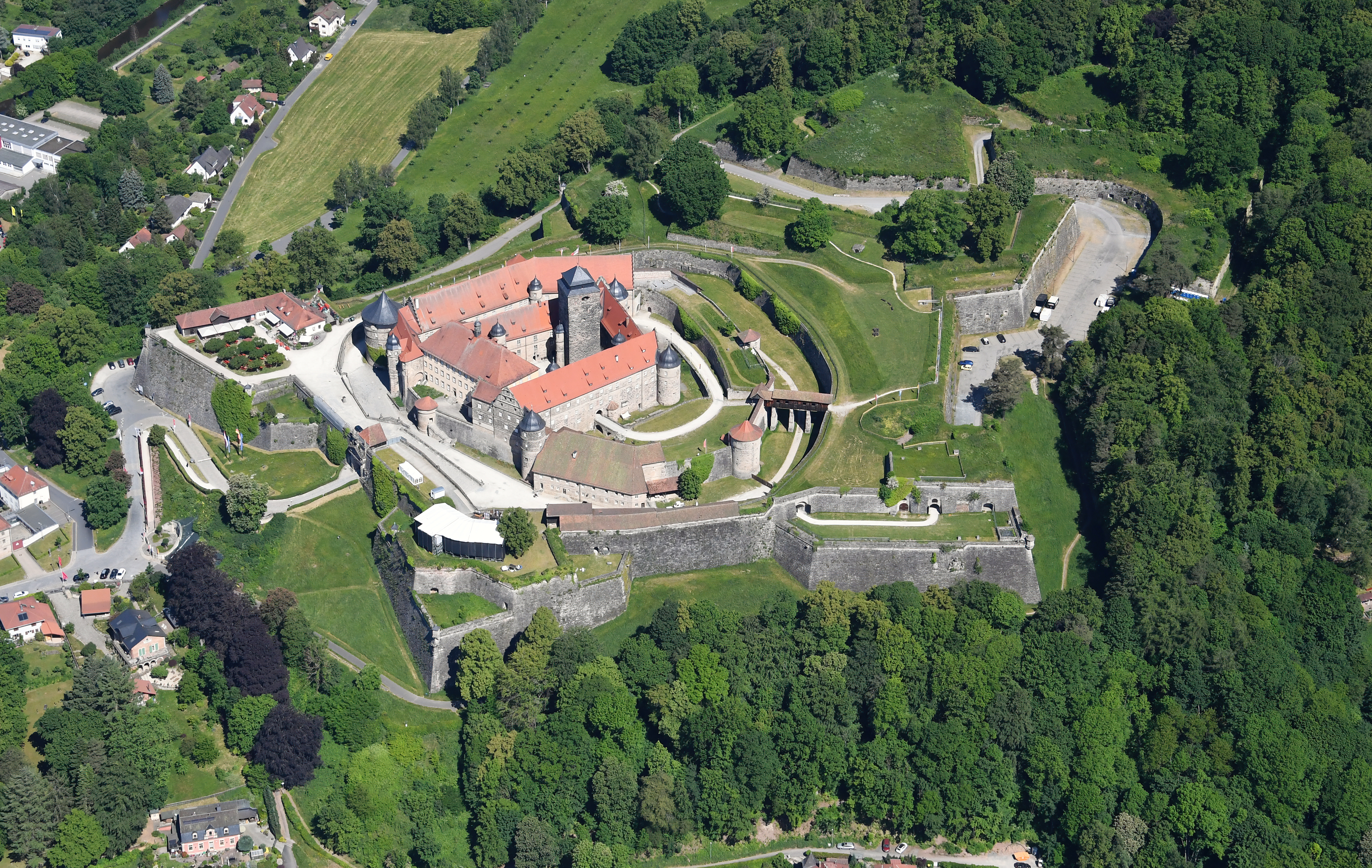
Rosenberg Fortress, which dominates the town

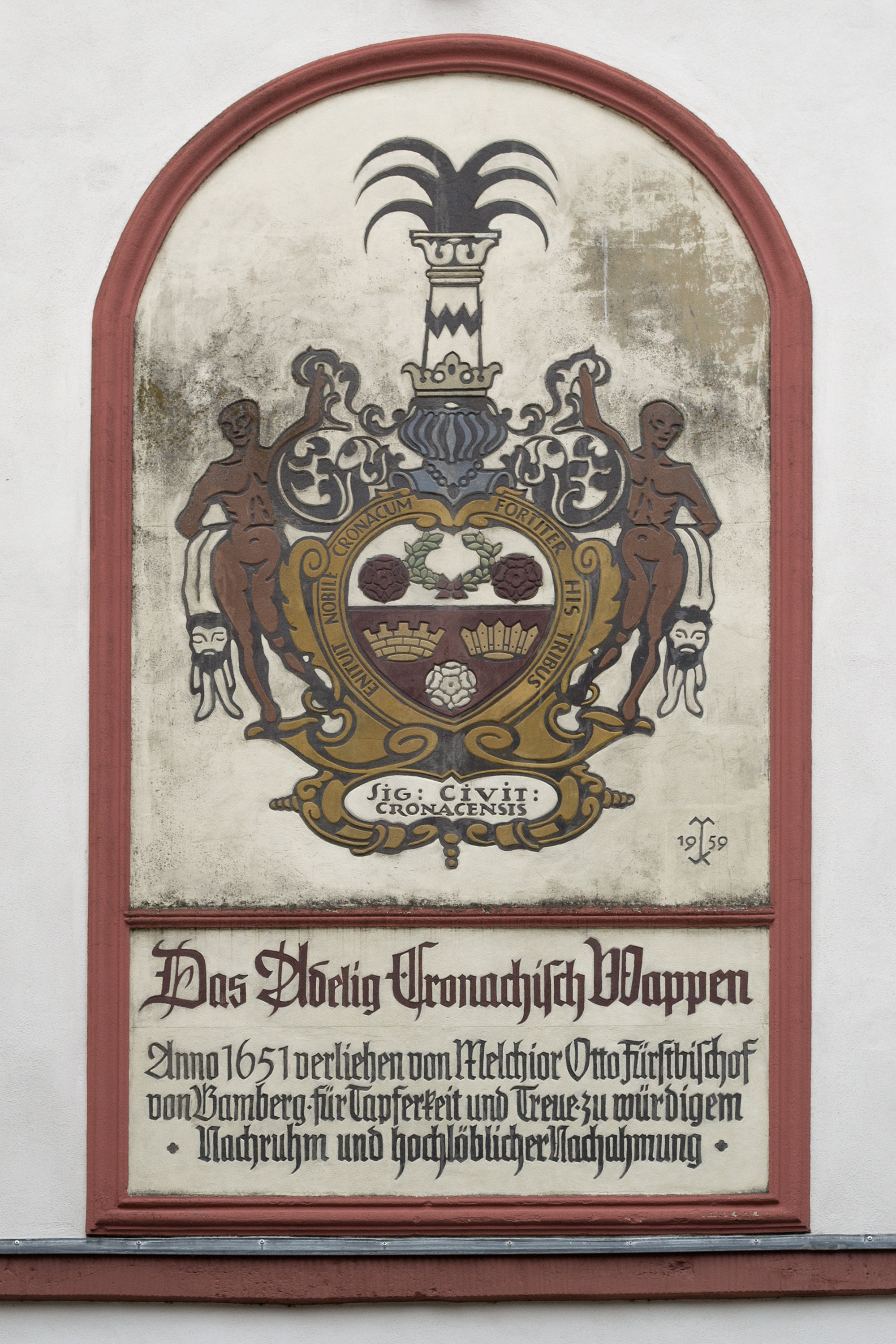
The greater coat of arms of Kronach, commemorating the flayed men

The area of Kronach has been occupied for millennia, and in the late Bronze Age, the Heunischenburg, the oldest known stone fortification north of the Alps, was built nearby.

Kronach was first mentioned in a chronicle of Thietmar of Merseburg in 1003 as urbs crana. In 1122, Holy Roman Emperor Henry V gifted Kronach and its surroundings (the praedium crana) to the Prince-Bishopric of Bamberg. Kronach remained part of the Prince-Bishopric until its secularization in 1803. The town's massive fortress originates from 1130, when Otto of Bamberg had a "stone house and tower" erected in Kronach. When Kronach gained town rights is unclear, but as its inhabitants were termed as "citizens" (cives) in a 1260 treaty, it can be assumed that it had attained rights before that date.

Kronach was put under siege by the Hussites in 1430. Although the defense was successful and the fortress remained unconquered, its inhabitants burned part of the town to block the invaders. This destruction caused discord among the town's Burghers, which was only resolved through the intervention of the Prince-Bishop in 1439 through the conference of privileges to the Upper Town of Kronach.

With the Reformation in 1517, Kronach became an important border bulwark of the Catholic Prince-Bishopric against the newly Protestant Electorate of Saxony, this function continued until peace was made in 1648. This border function made thorough fortification necessary, and it was during this period that Rosenberg Fortress was expanded the most. However, many of the inhabitants of the town and its surroundings converted to Protestantism early on. Protestants were eventually expelled from the town by the early 17th century, following the maxim of Cuius regio, eius religio, and were only allowed back after the secularization in 1803.

During the German Peasant's War, in 1525, the town and fortress surrendered to the peasant host, under the condition that the fortress would not be plundered. Following the intervention of the Swabian League, the peasants were forced out on 25 July 1525.

Kronach was once again plunged into conflict in 1552, during the Second Margrave War. Albert Alcibiades, Margrave of Brandenburg-Kulmbach, attempted to put the town under siege but failed due to the insufficient size of his army.

During the Bamberg witch trials, Kronach found itself at the center of witch hysteria, with several of its inhabitants being executed for alleged witchcraft. The trials were only ended by the Swedish invasion of Bamberg.

During the Thirty Years' War, the town experienced one of its most dramatic episodes. It was put under siege for two years, from 1632 to 1634, by a Swedish Army and its German allies, numbering between 3,000 and 5,000. Despite improbable odds, the town and fortress remained unconquered. Famously, after a Swedish sap tore a hole in the town wall in 1634, the Swedish soldiers were repulsed by the town's women, who rained down boiling substances on them and forced them to retreat. The unlikely victory is, to this day, commemorated by a "Swede's Procession" on the Sunday after Corpus Christi, where the citizens and clergy, led by women, march from the fortress to the town square. The siege also gave rise to a popular legend: allegedly, the siege finally ended after the citizens of Kronach let the last living animal in the town, a female rabbit (the Kroniche Housnküh) run free on the walls. This convinced the Swedes that the siege was hopeless, since Kronach had enough provisions to set a rabbit loose. The Kroniche Housnküh remains a mascot of the city. The siege is also commemorated, in a macabre manner, on the town's greater coat of arms. The supporters of the shield are two flayed men: according to legend, saboteurs who were executed by the Swedes and their corpses sent back to the town gates. During the war, Kronach was struck twice by plague, in 1629 and 1634, killing circa 300 and circa 400 people respectively.

Kronach was once again put under siege by the Prussian Army during the Seven Years' War. Situated on the Kreuzberg, a hill overlooking the fortress, the Prussians attempted to use field artillery to destroy the fortress. However, their efforts proved insufficient, and the Prussians decided to bypass Kronach and march south.

In 1803, as a result of the Reichsdeputationshauptschluss, the Prince-Bishopric of Bamberg was secularized, and Kronach was made part of the Electorate, later Kingdom of Bavaria. Kronach lost some of its privileges, and its town walls and fortress were no longer seen as modern or necessary, with parts of the former being reused or demolished.

In 1853, Kronach got its first rail line, and in 1866, its first train station. Today, it is a stop on the Franconian Forest Railway. In 1897, it was connected to the Bavarian telephone network.

During the First World War, the Fortress was the site of an officers' prisoner of war camp, in which, among others, a young Charles de Gaulle was interned from July 20 to November 21, 1917. Following two attempted escapes from the fortress, he was transferred to Ingolstadt Fortress. Kronach also hosted a hospital for wounded soldiers.

Due to its proximity to the early NSDAP stronghold of Coburg, Kronach fell under the influence of the Nazi Party early on. The first Nazi State Diet Faction in Germany was founded at a hotel in Kronach, in the presence of Adolf Hitler, Julius Streicher, Hermann Esser, and other Nazis on July 28, 1925. The local SS division, founded later the same year, was one of the first in Germany. After years of steady Nazi growth, the town was fully put under the party's control in March 1933.

The Jewish community of Kronach, which had existed since at least the 14th century and numbered 35 individuals in 1933, was destroyed by Nazi persecution. Synagogue services were ended in 1936, with the building being sold to the town, and the remaining Jewish families were deported starting in 1938. Those who did not emigrate were mostly murdered in concentration camps in 1941 and 1942.

The Subcamp Gundelsdorf, a subcamp of Flossenburg Concentration Camp, was situated in Gundelsdorf, today a town quarter of Kronach. Around 100 Polish Jews were imprisoned there and used as forced labor for the Luftwaffe. From 1942 to 1944, the Fortress was also used as a forced labor camp, originally producing industrial porcelain for Rosenthal and, by war's end, producing the Messerschmidt Me 163 Komet in a specialized facility built into one of the Fortress' bastions.

Kronach was not subjected to mass air raids, and most of the town survived unharmed, although air raids targeting the town's train station started in March 1945. Kronach refused to surrender to the advancing US Army, and was attacked by the 11th Armored Division of the Third Army under George Patton on the morning of April 12, 1945. After heavy fighting that resulted in the destruction of 15 buildings, the Americans marched into the town square in the evening of the same day.

After the end of the war, Kronach received thousands of East German emigrants, it also hosted deported Sudeten Germans from the former Landkreis of Podersam. The town hosted the Bavarian Regional Garden Show in 2002, and celebrated its millennial anniversary in 2003.

== Notable people ==
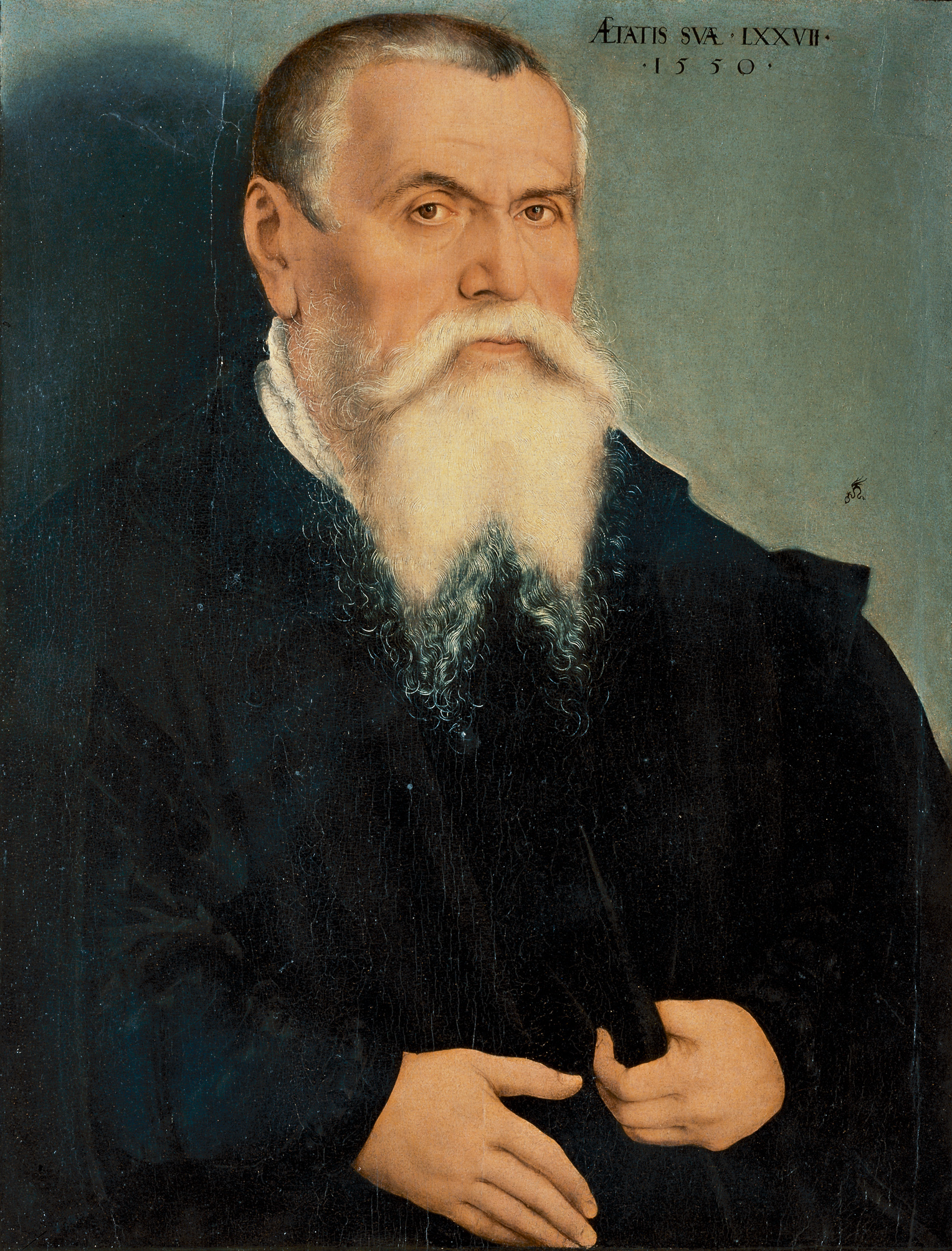
Lucas Cranach, 1550

- Lucas Cranach the Elder (ca.1472–1553), a German Renaissance painter and printmaker in woodcut and engraving.
- Burchard Kranich (ca.1515 – 1578), (also known as Doctor Burcot) a mining engineer and physician who was involved in mining ventures in Derbyshire and Cornwall
- Maximilian von Welsch (1671–1745), a German architect, construction director and fortress master builder.
- Johann Kaspar Zeuss (1806–1856), a German historian and founder of Celtic philology.
- Josef Stangl (1907–1979), a Roman Catholic bishop of Würzburg, Germany; he consecrated Father Joseph Ratzinger, later Pope Benedict XVI, as a bishop in 1977.
- Heinrich Setz (1915–1943), Luftwaffe military aviator during WWII, and a fighter ace
- Gloria Friedmann (born 1950), a German-French sculptor and installation artist
- Sebastian Borger (born 1964), a German journalist and author based in London.
- Axel Kober (born 1970), a German conductor and music director of the Deutsche Oper am Rhein since 2009.
- Kristian Böhnlein (born 1990), a German professional footballer with over 250 club caps
- Jessica Wich (born 1990), a football striker, she plays for Bayer 04 Leverkusen (women)

== Sights ==
- Heunischenburg, a prehistoric hillfort nearby
- Festung Rosenburg, the historic fortress that dominates the city

== Twin towns – sister cities ==
Kronach is twinned with:

- Hennebont, France
- Kiskunhalas, Hungary
- Rhodt unter Rietburg, Germany
