= Adam Jabiri =

German footballer (born 1984)

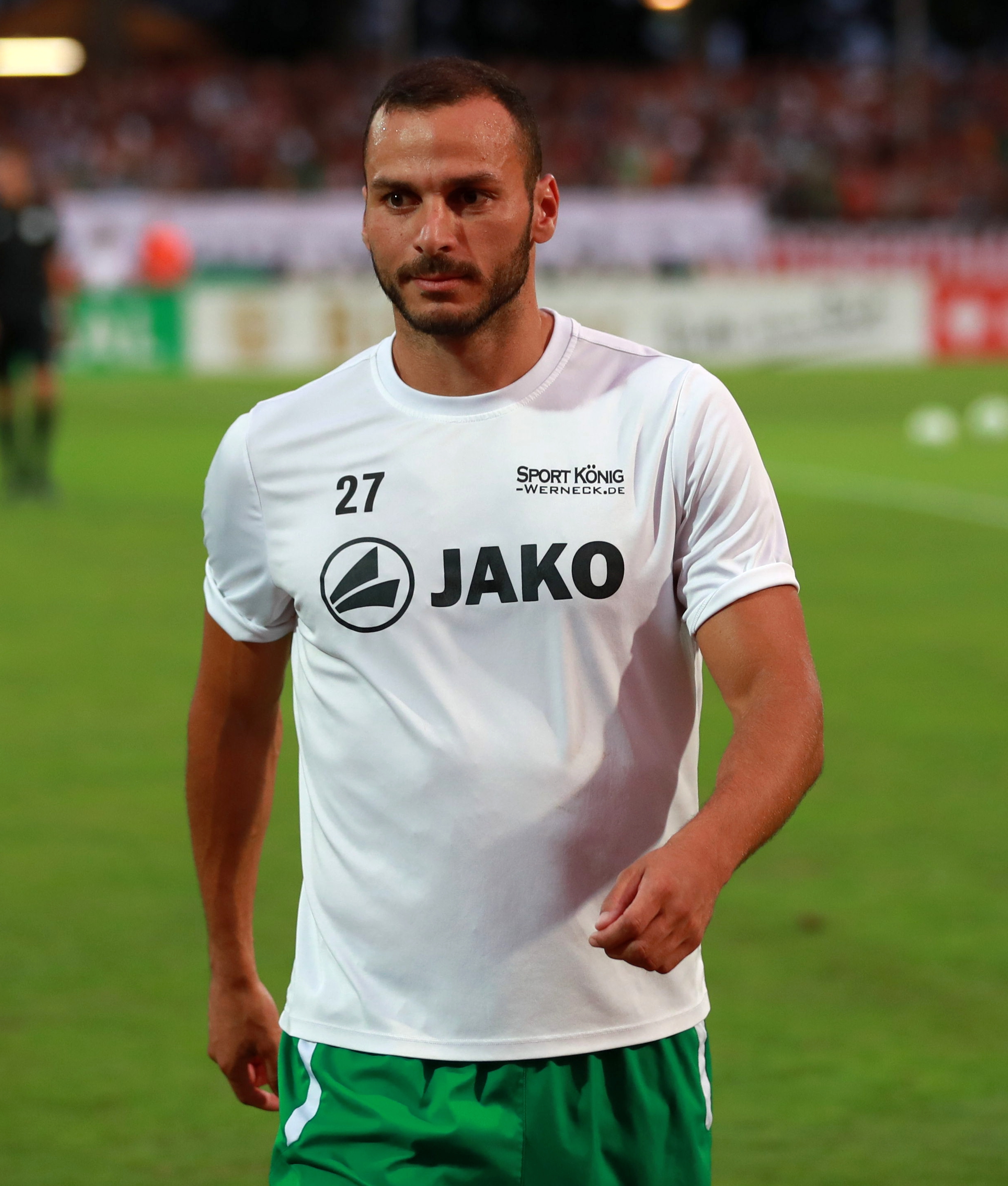
- Jabiri in 2018

Personal information
- Full name: Adam Jabiri
- Date of birth: 3 June 1984 (age 42)
- Place of birth: Kitzingen, Germany
- Height: 1.87 m (6 ft 2 in)
- Position: Forward

Team information
- Current team: 1. FC Schweinfurt 05
- Number: 27

Senior career*
Years	Team	Apps	(Gls)
2007–2008	Rot-Weiß Erfurt	1	(0)
2008–2009	TSV Großbardorf	30	(12)
2009–2010	1899 Hoffenheim	1	(0)
2010–2011	1899 Hoffenheim II	23	(9)
2011–2012	1. FC Heidenheim	8	(1)
2012–2014	Wormatia Worms	28	(14)
2014–2016	Würzburger Kickers	52	(18)
2016–	1. FC Schweinfurt 05	205	(125)
- * Club domestic league appearances and goals as of 1 May 2024

Adam Jabiri (born 3 June 1984) is a German former professional footballer who played as a forward for 1. FC Schweinfurt 05.

== Career statistics ==
As of match played 13 August 2021

Appearances and goals by club, season and competition
Club	Season	League			DFB-Pokal		Other		Total	
Club	Season	Division	Apps	Goals	Apps	Goals	Apps	Goals	Apps	Goals
Rot-Weiß Erfurt	2008–09	3. Liga	1	0	0	0	—		1	0
TSV Großbardorf	2008–09	Regionalliga Süd	30	12	—		—		30	12
1899 Hoffenheim	2009–10	Bundesliga	1	0	0	0	0	0	1	0
1899 Hoffenheim II	2010–11	Regionalliga Südwest	23	9	—		—		23	9
1. FC Heidenheim	2011–12	3. Liga	8	1	0	0	—		8	1
Wormatia Worms	2012–13	Regionalliga Südwest	8	2	0	0	—		8	2
Wormatia Worms	2013–14	Regionalliga Südwest	22	12	—		—		22	12
Wormatia Worms	Total		30	14	0	0	0	0	30	14
Würzburger Kickers	2014–15	Regionalliga Bayern	27	14	1	0	—		28	14
Würzburger Kickers	2015–16	3. Liga	25	4	1	0	1 (Note: Appearance in the 3. Liga promotion play-offs)	0	27	4
Würzburger Kickers	Total		52	18	2	0	1	0	55	18
1. FC Schweinfurt 05	2016–17	Regionalliga Bayern	28	14	—		—		28	14
1. FC Schweinfurt 05	2017–18	Regionalliga Bayern	33	28	2	0	—		35	27
1. FC Schweinfurt 05	2018–19	Regionalliga Bayern	28	12	1	0	—		29	12
1. FC Schweinfurt 05	2019–2021	Regionalliga Bayern	25 (Note: Including Championship play-offs)	16	0	0	2 (Note: Appearances in the 3. Liga promotion play-offs)	0	27	16
1. FC Schweinfurt 05	2021–22	Regionalliga Bayern	7	6	0	0	—		6	5
1. FC Schweinfurt 05	Total		121	75	3	0	2	0	126	75
Career total			266	129	5	0	3	0	266	129

== Honours ==
Rot-Weiß Erfurt

- Thuringia Cup: 2007–08

1. FC Heidenheim

- Württemberg Cup: 2011–12

Würzburger Kickers

- 3. Liga: Third place 2015–16 (promotion to 2. Bundesliga)
- Regionalliga Bayern: Champion 2014–15
- Bavarian Cup: 2015–16

1. FC Schweinfurt 05

- Regionalliga Bayern: Champion 2019–21
- Bavarian Cup: 2016–17, 2017–18
- Regionalliga Bayern top scorer: 2017–18 (28 goals)
