= Iliya Gruev =

Bulgarian footballer (born 1969)

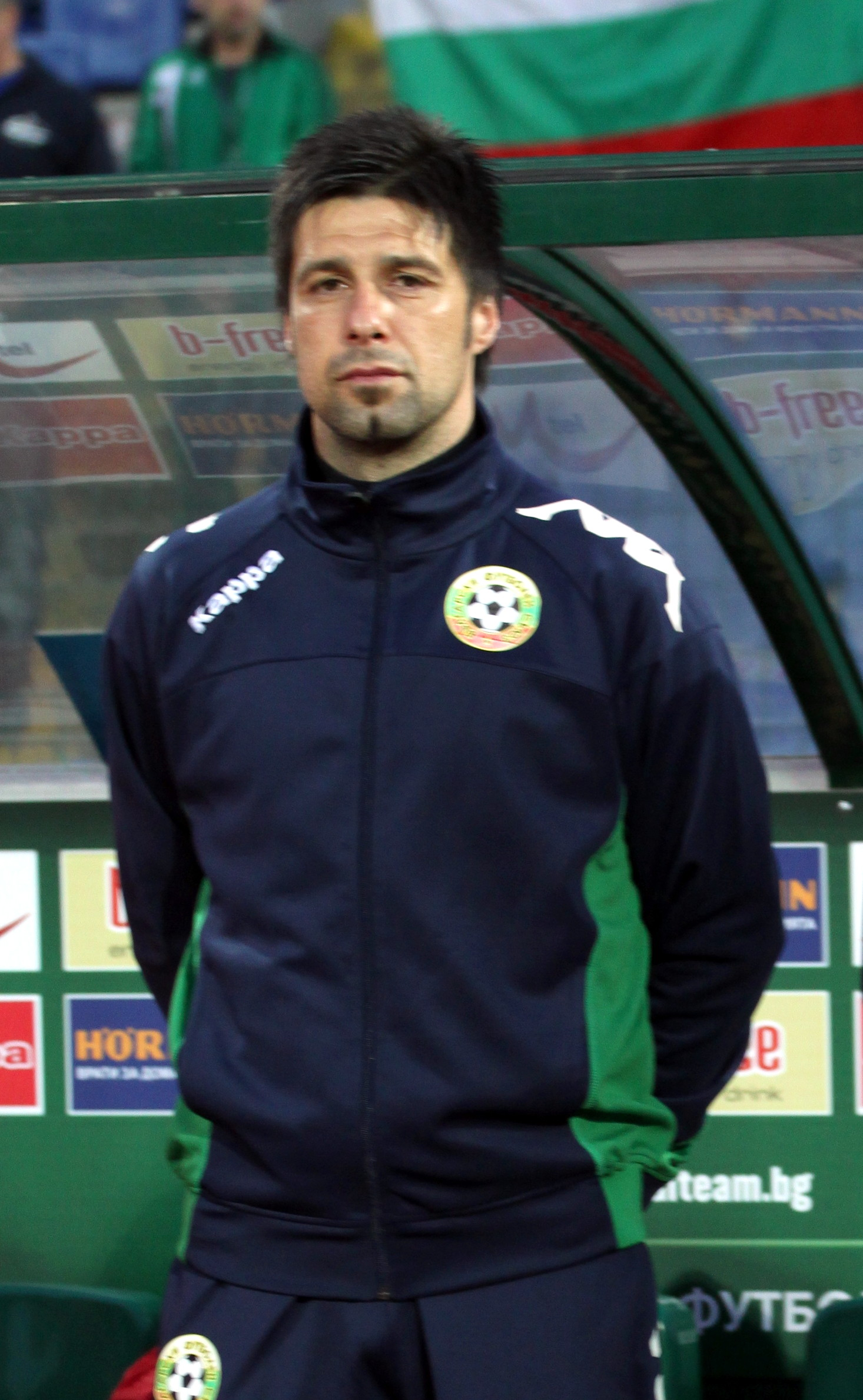
- Gruev with Bulgaria in 2011

Personal information
- Full name: Iliya Hristov Gruev
- Date of birth: 30 October 1969 (age 56)
- Place of birth: Sofia, Bulgaria
- Height: 1.78 m (5 ft 10 in)
- Position: Midfielder

Senior career*
Years	Team	Apps	(Gls)
1988–1991	Levski Sofia	53	(0)
1992	Slavia Sofia	15	(0)
1992–1993	Altay	27	(4)
1993–1994	Lokomotiv Sofia	17	(4)
1994–1995	Altay	30	(2)
1995–1996	Montana	12	(0)
1996–2000	Naftex Burgas	141	(35)
2000–2004	MSV Duisburg	80	(11)
2004–2005	KFC Uerdingen 05	30	(5)
2005–2006	Rot-Weiß Erfurt	18	(1)
Total		523	(62)

International career
1997–1999	Bulgaria	13	(1)

Managerial career
- 2009–2010: Chernomorets Burgas (assistant)
- 2011: Bulgaria (assistant)
- 2011–2012: Hajduk Split (assistant)
- 2012: Kaiserslautern (assistant)
- 2012–2013: MSV Duisburg (assistant)
- 2013–2015: Kaiserslautern (assistant)
- 2015–2018: MSV Duisburg
- 2019–2020: Werder Bremen (assistant)
- 2021–2022: Arminia Bielefeld (assistant)
- 2022: Arminia Bielefeld (caretaker)
- * Club domestic league appearances and goals

Iliya Hristov Gruev (Bulgarian: Илия Христов Груев; born 30 October 1969) is a Bulgarian retired professional footballer. Until 2022 he was assistant manager at Arminia Bielefeld.

== Playing career ==
Gruev started out at Levski Sofia. Later, he played for Slavia Sofia, Lokomotiv Sofia and Montana in his home country and Altay in Turkey. After that he spent almost five years at Neftochimic Burgas before leaving for Germany to represent MSV Duisburg from 2000 to 2004. Following that he played for KFC Uerdingen 05 before finishing his active career in Rot-Weiß Erfurt.

Gruev has 13 caps for Bulgaria, scoring once – on 11 October 1997, in the 2–4 away loss in a 1998 World Cup qualifier against Russia.

== Managerial career ==
=== Assistant manager ===
He was assistant coach in Chernomorets Burgas, Hajduk Split, Duisburg, 1. FC Kaiserslautern and Bulgaria from 2009 to 2015.

=== MSV Duisburg ===
After MSV Duisburg's bad results and following the release of their manager Gino Lettieri, Gruev was announced as the new manager of the team, signing a contract until 2017, becoming a first team manager for the first time. In the 2016–17 season, Duisburg won the 3. Liga and got promoted to the 2. Bundesliga.

Gruev was sacked on 1 October 2018 after the team scored only two points out of the first eight matches. Torsten Lieberknecht became the new head coach.

=== Werder Bremen ===
In summer 2019, Gruev joined Werder Bremen as an assistant coach with a focus on set pieces.

== Personal life ==
Gruev's son Ilia is also a professional footballer for Leeds United.

== Career statistics ==
=== International goal ===
Scores and results list Bulgaria's goal tally first, score column indicates score after each Gruev goal.

List of international goals scored by Iliya Gruev
No.	Date	Venue	Opponent	Score	Result	Competition
1	11 October 1997	Luzhniki Stadium, Moscow, Russia	Russia	1–4	2–4	1998 World Cup qualifier

=== Managerial statistics ===
As of 29 September 2018

Team	From	To	Record							
Team	From	To	G	W	D	L	Win %	GF	GA	GD
MSV Duisburg	6 November 2015	1 October 2018	105	38	33	34	36.19	143	139	+4
