= 2019–2021 Regionalliga Bayern =

8th season of the Regionalliga Bayern

Regionalliga Bayern
- Season: 2019–20; 2020–21
- Champions: 1. FC Schweinfurt
- Promoted: Türkgücü München (2019–20)
- Relegated: VfR Garching

The 2019–21 Regionalliga Bayern was the eighth season of the Regionalliga Bayern.

The season was originally scheduled as the 2019–20 season. After the Bavarian Football Association (BFV) cancelled the 2020–21 season, which would have been the ninth for this Regionalliga, and enrolled Türkgücü München for the 2020–21 3. Liga, the ongoing season had to resume without Türkgücü in September 2020 and conclude in mid-2021.

Originally, 18 teams from Bavaria competed in the eighth season of the Regionalliga Bayern. Türkgücü München and TSV Rain am Lech were promoted from the 2018–19 Bayernliga Süd and TSV Aubstadt was promoted from the 2018–19 Bayernliga Nord. After Türkgücü München was promoted to the 3. Liga, 17 teams continued competing.

The season was abandoned on 18 May 2021.

== Effects of the COVID-19 pandemic ==
Due to the COVID-19 pandemic in Germany, the BFV announced the postponement of the scheduled Regionalliga matchdays on 14 March 2020.

The Regionalliga Bayern clubs voted on 4 June 2020 to extend their league season beyond September, which meant the BFV had to cancel the 2020–21 season and continue without Türkgücü München, which the BFV registered for promotion to the 3. Liga. Thus, Bavaria is to be represented by a team that wins a play-off series, to be held in the spring of 2021, among the top four teams at the end of the resumed Regionalliga Bayern season. They will have already submitted applications for 3. Liga licences. The Bavarian play-off winners are to face the Regionalliga Nord champions for a place in the 2021–22 3. Liga. The rest of the season was abandoned on 18 May 2021. VfR Garching was relegated based on points per game, while the relegation play-offs were cancelled.

== League table ==
=== Before season break ===
Pos	Team	Pld	W	D	L	GF	GA	GD	Pts	Promotion or qualification
1	Türkgücü München (P)	23	17	3	3	51	20	+31	54	Promotion to 2020–21 3. Liga
2	1. FC Schweinfurt	23	14	3	6	49	28	+21	45	Qualification to 2020–21 DFB-Pokal (Note: The DFB-Pokal spot was given to the top team of the league on 27 October 2020, after Türkgücü München had been removed from the table. Türkgücü appealed to the Munich district court (Landgericht München I) against the Bavarian Football Association's (BFV's) earlier decision to register 1. FC Schweinfurt for the competition as the representative of the Regionalliga Bayern instead of Türkgücü but was unsuccessful as the judgment of a Nuremberg arbitral tribunal was pronounced, confirming BFV's choice to register 1. FC Schweinfurt for the DFB-Pokal.)
3	1. FC Nürnberg II	23	12	7	4	51	27	+24	43	
4	SpVgg Bayreuth	23	11	8	4	48	27	+21	41	
5	Viktoria Aschaffenburg	23	11	5	7	45	29	+16	38	
6	VfB Eichstätt	23	10	7	6	41	23	+18	37	
7	Greuther Fürth II	23	10	5	8	29	25	+4	35	
8	TSV Buchbach	23	9	7	7	29	31	−2	34	
9	TSV Aubstadt	22	9	6	7	37	34	+3	33	
10	FC Augsburg II	23	7	8	8	38	34	+4	29	
11	Wacker Burghausen	23	7	5	11	28	33	−5	26	
12	FV Illertissen	23	7	4	12	33	48	−15	25	
13	TSV Rain am Lech	22	7	3	12	24	40	−16	24	
14	SV Heimstetten	23	7	2	14	37	52	−15	23	
15	SV Schalding-Heining	22	6	5	11	26	47	−21	23	
16	1860 Rosenheim	23	6	3	14	29	56	−27	21	
17	FC Memmingen	22	4	7	11	22	36	−14	19	
18	VfR Garching	21	4	4	13	23	50	−27	16	

Source: kicker.de
Rules for classification: 1) Points; 2) Goal difference; 3) Goals scored
(P) Promoted

=== After season break ===
After Türkgücü München was promoted to the 2020–21 3. Liga, they were removed from the league table and all their results were expunged.

Pos	Team	Pld	W	D	L	GF	GA	GD	PPG	Qualification or relegation
1	Viktoria Aschaffenburg	25	15	5	5	51	27	+24	2.00	Qualification to championship play-offs
2	SpVgg Bayreuth	25	14	7	4	53	28	+25	1.96 (Note: Head-to-head points: SpVgg Bayreuth 4, 1. FC Nürnberg II 1)	Qualification to championship play-offs
3	1. FC Nürnberg II (Note: 1. FC Nürnberg II did not apply for a 3. Liga license.)	25	14	7	4	61	32	+29	1.96	
4	1. FC Schweinfurt	23	14	2	7	48	29	+19	1.91	Qualification to championship play-offs
5	TSV Aubstadt	25	11	6	8	43	41	+2	1.56	
6	VfB Eichstätt	26	10	7	9	46	32	+14	1.42	
7	TSV Buchbach	25	9	8	8	32	29	+3	1.40	
8	Greuther Fürth II	26	10	6	10	31	33	−2	1.38	
9	FC Augsburg II	25	9	7	9	44	35	+9	1.36	
10	SV Schalding-Heining	24	9	5	10	34	45	−11	1.33	
11	Wacker Burghausen	25	9	6	10	36	35	+1	1.32	
12	FV Illertissen	25	9	4	12	37	51	−14	1.24	
13	TSV Rain am Lech	25	9	3	13	26	41	−15	1.20	
14	SV Heimstetten	25	8	2	15	44	54	−10	1.04	
15	FC Memmingen	22	4	8	10	18	30	−12	0.91	
16	1860 Rosenheim	25	6	3	16	30	61	−31	0.84	
17	VfR Garching (R)	20	3	4	13	21	52	−31	0.65	Relegation to Bayernliga

Source: kicker.de
Rules for classification: 1) Points per game; 2) Head-to-head points; 3) Head-to-head goal difference; 4) Head-to-head goals scored; 5) Head-to-head away goals scored; 6) Goal difference; 7) Goals scored per game; 8) Number of wins per game; 9) Draw
(R) Relegated

== Championship play-offs ==
The top four eligible teams were originally supposed to play a best-of-five knockout tournament to determine the participant in the promotion play-offs against the champions of the 2020–21 Regionalliga Nord. However, on 28 April 2021 it was decided that the top three eligible teams Viktoria Aschaffenburg, SpVgg Bayreuth and 1. FC Schweinfurt will play in a double round-robin group to determine the promotion play-off participant.

Pos	Team	Pld	W	D	L	GF	GA	GD	Pts	Qualification	SCH	ASC	BAY
1	1. FC Schweinfurt (C)	4	3	1	0	9	2	+7	10	Qualification to promotion play-offs	—	1–1	2–1
2	Viktoria Aschaffenburg	4	1	1	2	8	7	+1	4		0–2	—	7–0
3	SpVgg Bayreuth	4	1	0	3	5	13	−8	3		0–4	4–0	—

Source: kicker.de
Rules for classification: 1) Points; 2) Head-to-head points; 3) Head-to-head goal difference; 4) Head-to-head goals scored; 5) Head-to-head away goals scored; 6) Goal difference; 7) Goals scored; 8) Number of wins; 9) Number of away goals; 10) Draw
(C) Champions

== Season statistics ==
=== Top scorers ===
Rank	Player	Club	Goals
1	(Germany) Fabian Eberle	VfB Eichstätt	16
1	(Germany) Lukas Riglewski	SV Heimstetten	16
3	(Germany) Ingo Feser	TSV Aubstadt	13
3	(Germany) Adam Jabiri	1. FC Schweinfurt	13
5	(Germany) Björn Schnitzer	Viktoria Aschaffenburg	12
